Muḥammad Rashīd ibn ʿAlī Riḍā ibn Muḥammad Shams al-Dīn ibn Muḥammad Bahāʾ al-Dīn ibn Munlā ʿAlī Khalīfa (23 September 1865 or 18 October 1865 – 22 August 1935 CE/ 1282 - 1354 AH), widely known as Sayyid Rashid Rida was a prominent Sunni Islamic scholar, reformer, theologian and revivalist. As an eminent Salafi scholar who called for the revival of Hadith sciences and a theoretician of Islamic State in the modern-age; Rida condemned the rising currents of secularism and nationalism across the Islamic World following the Abolition of the Ottoman sultanate, and called for a global Islamic Renaissance program to re-establish an Islamic Caliphate.

Rashid Rida is considered by many as one of the most influential scholars and jurists of his generation and was initially influenced by the movement for Islamic Modernism founded in Egypt by Muhammad Abduh. Eventually, Rida became a resolute proponent of the works of Ibn Taymiyyah, Muhammad ibn 'Abd al-Wahhab, etc. and was the leader of the early Salafiyya movement. Rida would be an important source of influence for a number of 20th century Salafi scholars such as Taqi ud Din al Hilali, Muhibb al Din al Khatib, Muhammad Hamid al-Fiqi, Muhammad Bahjat al-Bitar, Jamal al-Din al Qasimi, Ibn Uthaymin, 'Abd al-Zahir Abu al-Samh, Abdur Razzaq Malihabadi, Vakkam Abdul Qadir Moulavi and most notably Muhammad Nasir al-Din al-Albani.

As a young student trained in "traditional Islamic subjects" and classical treatises of Ghazzali and Ibn Taymiyya; Rida believed in the necessity of a "Reformation" to the halt the decline of the Muslim Ummah, eliminate heretical practices associated with Sufism and initiate an Islamic renewal. Rida left Syria for Cairo to work with Abduh and started publishing the influential al-Manar magazine from 1898. Through Al-Manar's popularity across the Islamic World, with an active readership across Java to Morocco, Rida led the Arab Salafi movement and championed its cause. Rashid Rida fiercely opposed freemasonry and the nascent Zionist movement. Rida bolstered anti-semitic, anti-masonic sentiments across the Islamic World via Al-Manar and laid the foundations for anti-Western pan-Islamist struggle during the early 20th century.

During the last three decades of his life, Rida abandoned his initial rationalist leanings and began espousing Salafi-oriented methodologies such as that of Ahl-i Hadith. He would become an admirer of the Wahhabi movement, revive the works of Ibn Taymiyya and spear-head the Salafiyya movement into a more conservative direction, adopting a strict Scripturalist approach. Through Al-Manar, Rida popularised Wahhabi teachings throughout the Islamic World. He is regarded by a number of historians as "pivotal in leading Salafism's retreat" from the rationalist school of 'Abduh. Rashid Rida was a staunch opponent of liberalism and was noteworthy for his animosity towards European Imperial powers. He was deeply suspicious towards Western ideas and supported armed Jihad to expel European influences from the Islamic World. Rida's strategy of rehabilitation of the Muslim Ummah through a return to its Islamic origins and calls for the obligation of re-establishing a Sunni Caliphate would be adopted by Muslim Brotherhood and inspire Jihadist movements such as Al-Qaeda.

Early life

Family Background 

Muhammad Rasheed Rida was born in the village of Al-Qalamoun, Beirut Vilayet near Tripoli in 1865. His father was an Imam in the masjid. Riḍā came from a Sunni Shafi'i family of modest means that relied on the revenues of their limited olive-tree holdings and fees earned by some of its members who served as ulama. For generations, the ulama of the Rida family had been in charge of Al-Qalamoun mosque. He belonged to a family of Sayyids who claimed descent from the Ahl al-Bayt (family of the Islamic prophet Muhammad), specifically Husayn ibn Ali. Stories of Al-Husayn were frequently repeated inside the family. Rida himself identified Al-Husayn as one of his "great-grandfathers" and often cursed those responsible for his martyrdom, without naming them.

Education 
As a young boy, Rida had received traditional religious education. Riḍā started his elementary education in a local Kuttab (Qurʾānic school) in Qalamūn, where he learned and memorized the Qur'an. He then moved to the Turkish government elementary school in Tripoli, where he studied grammar, mathematics, geography and religion, in addition to Arabic and Turkish. After one year, Rida enrolled in the National Islamic School (al-Madrasa al-Islāmiyya al-Waṭaniyya) of Shaykh Ḥusayn al-Jisr in Tripoli. The language of instruction of the school was Arabic and its curriculum included Islamic religious sciences, logic, mathematics and modern natural sciences. Riḍā's teachers included Maḥmūd Nashābeh (d.1890), who taught him hadith and Shafi'i Fiqh; ʿAbd al-Ghānī al-Rāfiʿī(d. 1890), who introduced him to the works of Yemeni jurist Al-Shawkani; and Muḥammad al-Kawukjī (d. 1887).

As a pious and motivated religious student,  Rida started preaching and educating others at a communal level. He gathered the people of his village to the Central mosque where he taught them Tafsir lessons and other religious sciences. He also arranged separate classes for females, instructing them on the rules of rituals and Ibadah. Rida's accidental discovery of several copies of the periodical al-Urwa al-Wuthqa during 1884–1885, edited by Jamal al-Din Al-Afghani and Muhammad Abduh, would change the course of his life. Rida collected its various issues from his father and Al-Jisr, became its avid reader and was highly influenced by it. He wrote to Afghani asking him to accept him as a disciple, but Afghani died before Rida had a chance to meet him.

Rida's education introduced him to the religious treatises of major classical scholars such as Ibn Taymiyya, Ibn Qayyim, Ibn Qudama, Ghazzali, Mawardi, Razi, Taftasani, Ibn Rajab etc. which he would regularly cite and re-publish in his later years. According to Lebanese-British historian Albert Hourani, Rashid Rida belonged to the last generation of traditionally trained Islamic scholars who could be "fully educated and yet alive in a self-sufficient Islamic world of thought."

Life in Egypt

Al-Manar Magazine and Collaboration With Abduh 

Rida had met Abduh as an exile in Lebanon in the mid-1880s. Rida was able to establish a relationship with Abduh and would refer to him as his Ustadh (mentor) throughout his life. After obtaining diploma of ulema in 1897, Rida joined Abduh in Cairo. Modelled after al-Urwa al-Wuthqa, they would start the monthly periodical Al-Manar. Rida would continue as its chief editor and owner until his death in 1935. After Abduh's death, Rida would publish Tafsir al-Manar as well as issue fatwas on various issues in the section Fataawa al-Manar. Tafsir al-Manar would later be published as a separate Qur'anic exegesis, although it remained incomplete. In the words of Albert Hourani; "from the time of its foundation, Al-Manar was... (Rida's) life."

After the death of Abduh, Rida would be seen as his de facto successor. Abduh's disciples would subsequently divide into opposing camps. One camp were Islamic modernists (such as Saad Saghlul, 'Ali 'Abd al-Raziq) who called for embracing European secular values and legal system. The other camp was the " Al-Manar Reform Party " which advocated the revival of Islam and sought to base sharia for organisation of both state as well as society. From this camp, would emerge in the Salafiyya movement. Rida would engage in fierce campaigns against the modernists, often invoking Abduh's legacy even though Abduh wouldn't have shared his views. Unlike Afghani and Abduh whose movement sought to "modernise Islam", Rida and his Salafiyya school sought the "Islamization of modernity".

During his stay in Egypt, Rida was able to research the classical treatises of theologian Ibn Taymiyya and his disciples, in depth. This would make a profound impact in his religious thought; and Rida would embrace various ideas such as revulsion against folk Sufism, criticism of Taqlid, calls for revival of hadith studies, etc. which became the foundational themes of the Salafiyya school.

Differences with Abduh

Initial Dispute 

Despite their different backgrounds, a serious-minded and religiously pious, young Rashid Rida developed a close-relationship with the broad-minded Abduh. The first major dispute between them arose over the status of the Baháʼí Faith. Muhammad 'Abduh viewed the Baha'is as a creative minority who were attempting to reform Shi'ite faith and whose efforts were relevant for Islamic reform. Rashid Rida, on the other hand, considered Bahais as a totally separate religion with its own distinctive laws and concluded that they were esotericists pretending to believe in Islam while practising another religion. He perceived them as modern equivalents of Fatimids and as a destructive internal threat to Islam. Rida was disheartened to hear of Abduh's friendship with 'Abdu'l-Baha Abbas, the head of Bahai faith and his praise of his liberal ideas. Abduh's arguments supporting Bahai stances were unacceptable to Rida, who was determined to convince Abduh of its falsehood. In Rida's view, Bahai faith, like all the other non-Muslim religious movements were falsehood and there was no room for "partially true" movements. Not only did Rida consider Bahai's as polytheists, but anyone who refused to condemn them were also excommunicated as apostates.

Stance on Wahhabis 

Abduh had disliked the literalism of the Wahhabi movement. In his conversations with Rida, Abduh alleged about the Najdi movement:

Abduh criticized the Wahhabis and their religious ethos for running counter to the intellectual and social objectives of Islamic modernism. Although the Wahhabis were against taqleed, 'Abduh complained that they ended up being more narrow-minded and extreme than the blind imitators. According to him, they were no "friends of science and civilization". Rida on the other hand, was a staunch defender of Wahhabis and advocated their rehabilitation in the Islamic World. Unlike Abduh, Rida identified as a Salafi in creed and relied heavily on transmitted reports (naql). But as a balanced reformer, Rida still upheld notions of rationality and progress. Additionally, Abduh was mostly unfamiliar with the works of Hanbali theologian Ibn Taymiyya and was quite critical of his reputed literalism. In contrast, Rashid Rida admired Ibn Taymiyya as a major scholarly figure in the history of Sunni Islam who had a profound impact on Islamic religious thought and directly criticised Abduh for his negative attitudes towards Ibn Taymiyya.

Theological Differences 

Abduh's conception of Tawhid was built almost entirely upon Ash'ari theology. Abduh's definition of Tawhid was only limited to mean what Salafis understand as al-rubūbiyyah (the Lordship of God). He also adopted the Ash'ari methodology of metaphorical and interpretive view of what he viewed as potentially anthropomorphic descriptions of Attributes of God. Rashid Rida, who was advocating Salafi theology after the First World War, would correct his teachers views. In response to Abduh's statement in Risalah al Tawhid that the most important aspect of Tawhid is belief in "God's oneness in His essence and the creation of the universes", Rida remarks that Abduh failed to mention tawḥīd al-ʾulūhiyyah which he viewed as “the first thing to which every Prophet called upon his people.” He also disputed Abduh's stance on Divine Attributes. In his long editorial footnote to the section where Abduh advocates ta'wil (allegory) or tafwid (suspending the meaning) of what he considered as potentially anthropomorphic Attributes, Rida refuted Abduh's views and repeated the standard Salafi arguments against the Ash'ari and Maturidite schools. Abduh's section which favoured the Ash'ari view on Qur'anic letters and its recitation as "created" was also deleted. Instead, Rida advocated the traditionalist doctrine of Qur'anic letters, recitation and voice being uncreated (ghayr Makhluq) Word of God; based on the works of Ibn Taymiyya.

Abduh had a liberal, humanist outlook and sought to unite various Islamic sects. In line with his tolerant approach, Abduh had interpreted the Prophetic hadith of "73 sects" to argue that no Muslim can be assured of belonging to the saved sect and that all surviving groups are included in the Saved Sect. Directly criticising Abduh on the issue, Rida stated that the “saved sect” was indisputably Ahlul Sunna wal Jama'ah (i.e. Sunni Islam). Abduh's conception of Islamic regeneration embraced the era of classical scholarship and its figures such as Ghazali. Meanwhile, Rashīd Rida, influenced by his early exposure to Hanbali school in Syria, envisioned a puritanical renewal based on the revival of the values of the Salaf al-Salih (first three Muslim generations).

Political Differences 

Unlike 'Abduh, Rida also believed that problems faced by Muslims required comprehensive political reform. Politically, Rida differed from 'Abduh and his former associates in championing anti-imperialist activism characterised by radical Pan-Islamist stances. This was at odds with the political quietism of 'Abduh or the nationalist activism of the Egyptian leader Saad Zaghlul, another prominent disciple of 'Abduh. Rida's Salafiyya movement advocated for pan-Islamist solidarity which involved socio-political campaigning to establish Sharia (Islamic laws). Following World War I, Rida and his disciples became the biggest adversaries of Egyptian nationalists; and vehemently attacked all forms of secular ideas.

Initially, Rida was a supporter of Ottoman Empire as the bastion of Islamic strength. He proposed the creation of an Islamic Empire, wherein the ulema of various Islamic sects - Sunni, Shi‘a, Ibadi - draft a modern code of law based on Sharia under the leadership of the Ottoman Caliph. After his proposals of reform were rejected by Sultan Abdul Hamid II, Rida would briefly back the Young Turk Revolution and Hashemite-led Arab revolt during World War I. However, Atatürk's actions of abolition of Caliphate would be a shock to Rida and he would later regret his past decisions. During 1922–1923, Rida would publish a series of articles in Al-Manar titled “The Caliphate or the Supreme Imamate”. In this highly influential treatise, Rida advocates for the restoration of Caliphate and proposes gradualist measures of Education, Reformation and Purification through the efforts of Salafiyya Reform movements across the globe.

In advocating a restoration of the Caliphate, Rashid Rida would re-iterate the unity of both the spiritual and temporal aspects of Islam, in direct opposition to the emerging tides of secularism across the Arab and Turkish worlds. In "The Caliphate or the Supreme Imamate" he discusses the conditions necessary for the revival of the ideal Caliphal rule and proposes routes that would avoid a return to the Ottoman imperial system. Acclaiming the early Islamic territorial conquests, Rida stated:

Opposition to Modernists 

During his early years, Rida was influenced by 'Abduh and Afghani and he attacked the official clergy throughout his writings. At this stage, Rida considered the traditional Sufi clergy to be the biggest obstacle to revival of Islamic civilisation and reformation of Muslims. Despite this, Rida never shared Muhammad 'Abduh's intellectual accommodation for Western civilization and European ideas. Rather than the Western and Persian philosophers admired by 'Abduh, Rida was inspired by classical Islamic scholars such as Ibn Taymiyya and his hardline Hanbalite treatises. Instead of criticising Sufism based on its perceived role in the Islamic historical scheme; Rida opposed Sufis since he considered their activities to be bid'ah (innovations) without textual precedents or any sanction in the practices of the earliest generations.

The advancement of secularist trends would later make Rida turn his attention on the Westernised modernisers. Rida would fiercely attack the modernisers, accusing them of sowing corruption, immorality and charging them "with treason". For Rida, Scriptures cannot be ignored and any "reforms" that goes against Scripture is a heresy that should be censured. Rida's fierce campaigns were instrumental in putting modernists like Ali Abd al-Raziq to trial for what he viewed as his "attacks" on Sharia. Rida would extol Ibn Hazm, an early scholar of the Zahiri (literalist) school, whom he regularly cited. In line with his literalist methodology, Rida would gradually distance from the tolerant approach of Abduh and Afghani.

Rida was also a staunch opponent of Hadith-rejectionist trends in Egypt. Prominent amongst them was the Egyptian physician Muhammad Tawfiq Sidqi who grew out of the modernist traditions of Muhammad Abduh. Sidqi cast aspersions on the hadith corpus, suggesting that it has been prone to corruption due to flawed transmissions and hence, Muslims should rely solely on Qur'an. Rashid Rida rebuked Sidqi's views, writing:

Hence, Rida argued, Sidqi's assault on hadith, was a rejection of this prophecy, reducing Muhammad to a minor figure and slandering him. Ridā's public stance against Sidqi forced him to recant his views.

Although Rida's initial views mirrored the modernist approach of Abduh, he later became an admirer of Ibn Taymiyya and Muhammad Ibn Abd al-Wahhab and would adopt a more conservative and orthodox outlook. He believed that the modernists had gone too far in their reformist attempts, embracing Westernised lifestyles and thinking; thus leading Muslims to lose their faith. Rida advocated a return the ways of the salaf and urged Muslims to live entirely by the sharia. Reviving the ideas of Ibn Taymiyya, he employed the term Jahiliyya to refer to the conditions of contemporary Muslims and believed that governance not adhering to sharia was apostasy. This idea would become a major rationale behind the armed Jihad of future militant organisations.

After Abduh's Death 
As the successor of Abduh's legacy, Rida tried to depict him as an advocate of the Salafist doctrine to the Egyptian audience. Over two decades after his death, Rida claimed that Abduh was a "Salafi in creed" although his explication of divine attributes in his popular works such as Risalat al-tawheed was similar to Ash'arites and rationalists. Distraught by these ideas, Rida made various re-editions of Abduh's works to make them in conformity with the dogmas of the traditionalist creed. Abduh's appraisal of Abu al-Hasan al-Ash'ari (d. 936), the eponymous founder of the Ash'arite school, for reconciling the views "of the salaf and that of the khalaf" was downplayed; and Rida attached a lengthy annotation to describe al-Ash'ari's renunciation of Kalam and subsequent espousal of Hanbali theology towards his later years, as mentioned by Ibn Taymiyya. Rida praised Ibn Taymiyya for his medieval polemics that vindicated "the superiority of madhhab al-salaf over kalam", a significant historical aspect of theology ignored by Abduh. Even though Rida and his Salafi disciples had viewed Abduh to be a great reformer; they privately held grave reservations about his creedal beliefs.

When popular interest in Muhammad Abduh was revived in Egypt around twenty-five years after his death, two contesting narratives of him were available. One was a short biography published by Mustafa 'Abd al-Raziq, an Azharite student of 'Abduh, which stressed the rationalist legacy of Abduh's thought. Similar portrayals of Abduh would be espoused by Uthman Amin and Egyptian artist Muhammad Naji. The other narrative was elaborated by Rashid Rida, in his 1931 biographic work titled Tarikh al-ustadh al-imam al-shaykh Muhammad Abduh (“History of Professor the Imam Shaykh Muhammad Abduh”). The views of Muhammad Abduh attributed by Rida were closest to his own. His unorthodox views were either ignored or actively deleted from the editions of his works that Rida published. Rather than an exponent of rationalist theology, Muhammad 'Abduh was portrayed as a restorer of Islamic orthodoxy, an opponent of bid'ah- and an enthusiast of Ibn Taymiyya. Eventually, Rida's view of Muhammad 'Abduh would become the dominant one, enshrined in Egyptian school history lessons and in popular memory.

Through his writings in his last years, Abduh had begun acknowledging "Salafis (al-salafiyyun)" as Sunni Muslims "who adhere to the creed of the forefathers" in distinction from Asharis. Despite this, Muhammad Abduh never self-identified as a "Salafi" during his lifetime. Unlike 'Abduh, Rida identified himself as "Salafi" in both theology ('Aqida) as well as Jurisprudence (Fiqh). Other Salafi theologians like Jamal al-Din al Qasimi (d. 1332 A.H/ 1914 C.E) would narrate Abduh's embracal of Salafi theology in private encounters during his last years, although these claims would be scrutinised by others. In response to some of his critics, Qasimi states: “even though ['Abduh] sometimes followed the rules of the theoreticians and the speculative theologians, and even though he sometimes defended these rules, he did not deviate from his love of the salaf, and his creed [i'tiqaduhu] did not deviate from their wellspring.”

Proposal of Reform to Abdul Hamid II

World Islamic Congress 
In 1897, Rida had decided to expand his knowledge by studying under the active Pan-Islamic scholar, Jamal al-Din al-Afghani, who was at that time in Istanbul but died later that year. After suspecting the Hamidian administration of being responsible for his death, Rida left the empire and joined Afghani's student Muhammad 'Abduh (1849- 1905) in Egypt. Beginning from 1898, Rashid Rida published numerous articles in Al-Manar  counselling the Ottoman authorities to adopt a new religious strategy in the framework of the caliphal and Pan-Islamic policy of Sultan Abd al-Hamid II. For training future ulama as well as Qadis responsible for issuing fatwas and discussing religious affairs, Rashid Rida recommended the creation of different institutions in a standardised manner.

In an article published in 1898, Al-Manar would raise the issue of a World Islamic Congress for Muslim reformation, with the standardisation of creed, laws and teachings as its fundamental principle. Directly addressing Sultan Abdul Hamid II as Amir al-Mu'min, Rashid Rida wrote:

The proposed international society would publish a religious journal in the Sacred city, to counter innovations(bid'ah) and heretic ideas; as well as translating religious works to different languages. Rida had lamented the attitude of returning pilgrims, who spoke about their journeys, but not at all regarding the contemporary circumstances under which the rest of Muslims lived. The Khalifa himself would preside over the affairs of the society, while remaining its member just like the other members. The scholars of the society would compile legal works, drawn from all mad'habs(legal schools), adapted to contemporary situation and the resulting legislation should be implemented by the Khalifa in all Muslim lands.

Rida did not call for an immediate establishment of a spiritual caliphate, but a global religious society which would pave the way for it. Islamic unity required the abolition of sectarian differences and reviving the doctrines of the Salaf us Salih, who pre-dated different sects and mad'habs. While respecting the contributions of the scholarly eponyms of the mad'habs, Rida advocated a centralising policy of reunion of Muslim schools and sects through a return to the fundamentals of Faith. The proposal also had the political objective of uniting Muslims against European colonialism. Critiquing despotic systems, Rida believed that shura(consultation) is a basic feature of any Islamic state. He viewed the Caliphate as a necessary temporal power to defend Islam and enforce sharia. Maintaining that Islam fundamentally sought the implementation of sharia through authority, Rida wrote:

Ottoman Censorship 

Al-Manar proposals were met with poor and often, hostile reception from the Ottoman authorities. The choice of Mecca as the centre of the society and the relegation of the Caliph as an ordinary member of the society; alerted the Ottoman authorities for whom the domination of Istanbul and Ottoman dynastic claims to Caliphate were not open to dispute. Some of them proposed a Muslim Congress in Istanbul. However, according to Rida, it was harmful to set up such a Congress in Istanbul. Abdul Hamid II opposed the idea of a Congress both in Mecca as well as Istanbul. The Meccan Congress was opposed by the Sultan, viewing it as a ploy for Arab separatism and Hejazi autonomy. The Istanbul setting was perceived as an indirect way to establish a parliamentary forum in the capital of the empire. The proposals were in direct contradiction to the established Ottoman policy on enforcing the absolute authority of the Sultan.

Meanwhile, Rashid Riḍā's harsh denunciation of Sufism had enraged Abū l-Hudā al-Sayyādī (1850-1909), the sultan's Syrian advisor. Riḍā condemned the Rifāʿiyya and Qādiriyya Sufi orders for ritualising innovated practices. Due to this, the Ottoman authorities harassed Rida's family in Syria. Al-Sayyādī requested Badrī Bāšā, his brother-in- ̣law and the governor of Tripoli, to transfer Riḍā's brothers to military authorities. One of Rida's brothers was beaten and the authorities also tried to confiscate Rida's family mosque. Rida would report that Sayyadi had also planned to assassinate him in Egypt. The Hamidian administration would ban the journal Al-Manar in Ottoman regions. Later in 1901, Rida published a review on Kawakibi's famous essay, Characteristics of Tyranny(Tabāʾiʿ al-istibdād), which attacked Sufism as well as the Ottoman sultan directly.

Further Proposals 

Despite the censorship, al-Manar resulted in the wide dissemination of reformist proposals across the Islamic World. The theme of a World Muslim Congress was given detailed expression for the first time in Abd al-Rahman al-Kawakibi's famous literary piece of fiction, Umm al-qura, first published in 1900. Umm al-Qura(one of the names of the Islamic holy city of Mecca), was the setting of Kawakibi's fictional story of a Muslim congress and its proceedings. The article would become the staunchest anti-Ottoman elaboration of the Pan-Islamist movement. In the article, Kawakibi argued for an end to the Ottoman rule, and its replacement by an Arabian Qurayshi caliphate elected through a great Islamic congress. Rashid Rida took the outline of the article presented to him by Al-Kawakibi in Cairo, expanded it with consultation and made it famous, through serialization in al-Manar. Salafi reformist themes such as the stripping away of ritual accretions, Sufism, etc. were advocated by the article.

In spite of the rejection of his proposals as well as vehement Ottoman opposition, Rida supported the preservation of the Sultanate during the Hamidian era(1876-1909). The dynastic nature of Ottoman state, was reconciled with the classical legal approach of accommodating a “caliphate of conquest,” in which caliphs ruled through force, not shura, consent, and adherence to shari‘ah. While holding the Ottoman rule to be based on asabiyya(tribalism), Rida distanced himself from rebelling against the empire, since it may lead to the demolition of the only Islamic temporal power. With the emerging European colonial encroachment that threatened the Muslim World, the Ottoman Caliphate was seen an indispensable buffer. At this stage, Rida had restricted himself to advocating reforms for consultative governance within the Ottoman state. His writings also focused on condemning partisanship to mad'habs and all forms of factionalism. He also walked a tight-rope of supporting Arabism and promoting Arab pre-eminence while simultaneously advocating Islamic unity and condemning ethnic prejudice as un-Islamic. In the Arab religious nationalism advocated by Salafiyya, Arabs were better suited for Islamic leadership and hence Arab revival was identical with Islamic unity. Simultaneously, Rida called for Arab-Turkish co-operation, writing:

Ottoman Consultative Society 
In 1897, Rashid Rida, Rafiq al-‘Azm, and Saib Bey, a Turkish officer; founded the Ottoman Consultative Society(Jam‘iyat al-shura al-‘uthmaniyya) in Cairo. Azm served as the society's treasurer and Rida became the administrative head. Its members consisted of Turks, Armenians, and Circassians residing in Egypt. The Society called for Islamic unity embodied under an Ottomanist platform but condemned the autocratic Hamidian rule as well as European imperialism. Its journals from Cairo were printed in Arabic and Turkish and distributed across the empire through Al-Manar. During this period, the society's goals aligned with that of the Young Turks. However, the society disbanded following the Young Turk revolution in 1908 after which Azm joined the CUP in pursuit of modernist activism. Rashid Rida, on the other hand, became a vocal critique of the centralist Young Turks.

Conflicts with Ottoman authorities: 1905-1914 

For the Salafiyya scholars and activists, opposition to the Hamidian state was part of a wider religious reform project of liberating Muslims from the constrained religious interpretations of the state clergy. They insisted on the right to engage in Ijtihad in the field of Islamic law. Scholars like ‘Abd al-Rahman al-Kawakibi (d. 1902) combined their critique of both religious and political authority; seeing the resistance to Ottoman despotism as a critical element in the revival of religious knowledge and Islamic civilization. Scholars of the salafi reform programme found common ground with other activists in the Ottoman Arab provinces who believed that their future progress depended upon the reclamation and strengthening of Arab cultural tradition. For salafis, the promotion of Arabic as the language of revelation was necessary for the revival of the practice of ijtihad amongst legal scholars. The Salafi opposition to Ottoman despotism emphasised on religious reform as a means of socio-political rejuvenation.

Abdülhamid II's autocratic measures that stifled the civil society along with the acceleration of the modernising Tanzimat Project, limited the space for a public sphere where the affairs of state could be discussed in a critical manner. The Salafiyya movement popularised an Islamic alternative to the aspirations of the disgruntled conservative religious sections through a revival of values modelled during the era of the Salaf al-Salih. Implicit in the salafiyya worldview was a glorification of Arab Islam and a devaluation of Ottomanism; which idealised the eras of Muhammad, his companions and the Salaf; and viewed all that succeeded the Abbasids as a sad period of decline. The Islamic doctrines of shura and Ijtihad became a rallying base for critique of authoritarian state and popular Sufism. As the state grew more oppressive, the Salafiyya trend became further radicalised. The emerging fault-lines between authoritarian regimes and Islamic fundamentalist movements, would determine the rest of the political power-struggles of the post-Ottoman Middle East. Thus, as early as 1904, Rashid Rida had publicly applauded Ibn Sa‘ud's victory against the Ottoman allied Rashidis.

Persecution:1905-1908 
In June 1905, Ottoman authorities arrested Muhyi al-Din Himadah, former mayor of Beirut and a close associate of Muhammad 'Abduh under charges of Syrian separatism. Following Himada's arrest, Ottoman police conducted widespread raids across Syria on the homes of men suspected of complicity. The police arrested Rida's brother and confiscated books and letters from Rida's home. His father was also suspected of separatism. The articles disseminated through his magazine angered the authorities so much that by 1906, the Ottoman court in Tripoli had issued orders to arrest Rashid Rida, wherever he might be, under charges "of printing traitorous and slanderous items" in Al-Manar. Additionally, Rida became increasingly vocal in activities against the Hamidian regime. Sharp criticism of autocratic rule and calls for representative government through shura became a common theme in Al-Manar.

Prior to 1908, Conservative ulema were able to employ active Ottoman governmental support for their anti-salafi actions due to numerous reasons. Sultan Abdul Hamid had made a policy of pursuing an Islamic policy of patronising powerful Sufi orders. In addition, Wahhabi and Zaydi rebellions against Ottomans in 1902 and 1904 were exploited by the Sufi ulema to posit links between Salafi reformers and opposition to Sultan. Major Salafi scholars including Rida, Jamal al-Din al Qasimi, Abd al-Rahman al-Kawakibi, Abd al Razzaq al Bitar, Mahmud Shukri Al Alusi, etc. were accused of being "Wahhabi sympathisers" perceived as participating in a plot against the empire to establish an "Arab Caliphate". Between 1896 and 1908, Conservative Ulema persuaded Ottoman authorities to punish Salafis and succeeded in intimidating the reformers. Although they were able to harass Salafis, they couldn't convince any Ottoman governor to imprison or exile a Salafi since the ulema had lost much influence by then.

Young Turk Revolution

During the Young Turk Revolution of 1908, Rashid Rida states that he was working secretly for securing the Constitution from Sultan Abdul Hamid II hoping to benefit from the greater liberty it would allow for Islamic reform and revivalist activities. However, the subsequent transformation of Turkey by Mustafa Kemal had defeated his expectations and Rida charged the new Turkish leader with "pure unbelief and apostasy from Islam, of which there's no uncertainty". During this period, the conservative Ottoman ulema would increase their attacks on Rida and his disciples; charging them with "Wahhabism" for opposing popular Sufi practices. These ulema opposed the Ottoman Constitutionalist movement and accused Rashid Rida and his Syrian Salafi and Arabist supporters of being "Wahhabis".

Initially after the July revolution, Salafis were divided into two camps. Salafis like Tahir al Jaza'iri was suspicious of the CUP, viewing the revolution as a coup from personal to collective autocracy and refused to return to Syria. Others such as Abd al-Razzaq al-Bitar and Jamal al-Din al-Qasimi was initially much more hopeful of the prospects. The orthodox Sufi ulema and their supporters, on the other hand, began to preach openly against the CUP. Utilizing the new freedoms of assembly and speech,they established their own association, The Ulama Club; assisted by the former officials of the Hamidian administration.

Damascene Mob Incident (1908)

Shortly after the July revolution, Rida would visit Damascus in October 1908, while touring Syria and Lebanon. He had already been attacked during his Syrian journey, when a man struck his head with a club-chain. Since it was the eve of the 1908 Ottoman general elections, the Ulema Club decided to exploit Rida's visit to display their strength and stir up their supporters against the Salafis. In October 24, Rashid Rida gave a public lecture in the Umayyad Mosquebefore a large audience; addressing themes of Islamic revival and religious education of Muslims. During his lecture, he preached that praying to intercessors other than God is an act of polytheism(shirk). At this point, two Sufi shaykhs, interrupting his public lecture in the mosque, railed against Rida, accusing him of being a "Wahhabi" who rejected mad'habs. 'Abd al-Qadir al-Khatib, a leading Damascene figure of the Muhammadan Union, an organization that sought the restoration of Abd al-Hamid's rule, was amongst the chief agitators against Rashid Rida. He urged his supporters to denounce Wahhabis, alluding to Rida. The infuriated crowd besieged him, but his disciples were able to rescue Rida with great difficulty. After leaving the mosque, Rida learned that the riots were planned by powerful men who sought to influence the parliament and upon the advice of his disciples, he left Damascus the next morning. His disciples, Al-Bitar and Al-Qasimi were forced to seclude themselves in their homes and returned to their posts in their mosques only after four months.

Ottomanist Counter Coup (1909) 

The Constitutional Restoration of 1908 changed the political context of the Salafi conflict with the ulema. Salafis had backed the Committee of Union and Progress(C.U.P), the strongest Constitutionalist party. However, Salafis like al-Jazā'irī Tahir al-Jazairi were already alarmed by the ascendance of centralist factions in the CUP. It would take several years for the CUP to consolidate its power across the empire. In its first year of power itself, CUP would be challenged by factions of Ottoman army that sought to re-instate Abdul Hamid II, now rendered a nominal head. In Istanbul on April 13, number of Hamidian Ottoman soldiers joined religious students in an uprising to expel the C.U.P from the capital. As news of initial Hamidian victories reached damascus, the Ottomanist Muhammadan Union began celebrations and mobilised rallies. Once again the Sufi ulema put the heat on Salafis and began inciting riots to kill "Wahhabis". However, by April 24 a pro-CUP army entered Istanbul on April 24 and recaptured the city. Sultan Abdulhamid II was deposed by the Ottoman General Assembly on April 27 and the Damascene conservative ulama lapsed into political quiescence following their defeat in April 1909. The outcome of events in 1908-1909 heartened the salafis and dismayed the conservative ulama, who could no longer count on financial subsidies and the government's ideological antipathy toward religious reform.

For Rida, Abdul Hamid's role in the 1909 counter-coup demonstrated his illegitimacy. He viewed Abdul Hamid's deposal as a sign that God would end all tyranny, and called upon the Muslim community to unite against oppression. Following the revolution, he visited Istanbul in October 1909, with two aims: to reconcile between the Arabs and the Turks in the Ottoman Empire and to establish a school for Islamic missionaries in Istanbul. However, his proposals were turned down in both subjects and Rida became a sworn enemy of the Young Turks and their party CUP. His initial optimism on the newly appointed Sultan Mehmed V, would prove short-lived since effective power had been concentrated under the hands of the Young Turks, whose vision were at odds with the Salafis and Arabists. Rida concluded that Young Turks had abandoned Islamism and Ottomanism and were pursuing a nationalist, Turkification policy.

Clash with the Young Turks(1909-1914) 
Rashid Rida had initially set aside concerns about the nationalism of CUP. However, by 1909, he would be its staunch opponent, accusing it of "abandoning Islam and Ottomanism for nationalism, spreading heresy, turning Islamic government into European government, and sowing intrigue." Opposing the Young Turks, Rida sought decentralization of the empire without challenging the legitimacy of the Ottoman Sultan; following a difficult line of holding onto Ottomanism while also working for Arab unity. Until World War I, Rida advocated autonomy for imperial territories while seeking to maintain the caliphate in Istanbul.

Within two years after the revolution; Rida became convinced that the Ottoman Empire had succumbed to a "Zionist-Masonic influence". In November 1910, Rida publicly asserted that the Young Turk revolution had been orchestrated by the Jews through Freemasonry. According to Rida, the revolution was a Jewish response to the Hamidian regime's rejection of Zionist plans to reclaim of their Third temple in Jerusalem and its surrounding territories through which they sought to reestablish their kingdom. In the following months, he became pre-occupied with concerns of Jewish manipulation of the Ottoman state and argued that the Jews wielded immense influence over the Committee of Union and Progres and the Ottoman treasury. Declaring that the Arabs would forcibly resist the Zionist plans to purchase Palestine from the Freemasons in the Ottoman leadership; Rida warned that the ultimate ambition of the Zionists, assisted by the Young Turks; was to convert al-Aqsa mosque into a Jewish temple and cleanse Palestine from all of its Arab inhabitants.

Rida wrote numerous articles in the Turkish press; calling to shun ideas and policies based on nationalism and race. He warned that nationalism was a European concept contrary to Islamic principles, and would lead to the collapse of the multi-ethnic, multi-racial Ottoman Empire. During this phase, Rida's Arabism was limited to advocate Arab autonomy within the broader Ottomanist framework. He was careful to distinguish between his opposition to the CUP and his loyalty to the Ottoman state. On the eve of the 1911 Ottoman-Italian war in Libya, Rida wrote:

"Election of Clubs"(1912) 

The CUP and the conservative ulema had begun to make rapprochement after 1909, and by 1912 the Conservative ulema had allied with the CUP in the 1912 general elections; forming a common front against Salafis. CUP's persecution of salafis and Arabists had signaled an opportunity for the Sufi ulema to cooperate with the CUP, the empire's dominant power. CUP pragmatically allied with the conservatives, who controlled vast resources and held influence across the Empire. CUP candidate list consisted major conservative figures backed by the anti-salafi ulama. Meanwhile, Salafis and Arabists supported the decentralist forces led by opposition Freedom and Accord Party(Liberal Entente) that sought to represent the empire's minorities and Turks sympathetic to a decentralised administration. Salafis would back the Entente in 1912 elections. Rida and his allies would again be accused, this time by CUP, of secessionist plots and seeking an "Arab Caliphate". Persecution of Salafis would again begin, this time on a bigger scale. CUP would win elections after massive electoral fraud, earning it the nickname "Election of Clubs".

The Society of Arab Association
As early as 1910, Rashid Rida had started publicly attacking CUP members as "atheists and freemasons"; alleging them of exploiting Islam for selfish political ends and seeking the destruction of Islamic world. Fearing the imminent collapse of the Ottoman state, especially after Ottoman defeats in Tripoli and the Balkan wars, and concerned that Arab lands under Ottoman control may soon fall under the hands of the colonial European empires, Rida established a secret society known as "Jam'iyyat ul-Jami‘a al-Arabiyya" (the Society of the Arab Association) that sought a union of the Arabian Peninsula and the Arab Provinces of Ottoman Empire.

Through the secret activities of the society, Rida sought to strongly pressure the Ottoman state on behalf of the Arabs and also prepare a contingency plan for the defense of Arabs against European ambitions, should the Ottoman Empire disintegrate. In accordance with these objectives, Rida corresponded with Ibn Saud of Najd, Imam Yahya of Yemen and aI-Sayyid al-Idrisi of ‘Asir, and convinced them on the necessity of a pact between all the rulers of the Arabian Peninsula to strengthen the Arabs. Ibn Sa‘ud asked Rida to send a messenger to explain the plan from aa religious and political standpoint in order to persuade his followers. Rida sent him a messenger along with numerous religious treatises. However, due to outbreak of the First World War; the mission failed, and the books were confiscated in Bombay. The war also ruptured his correspondence with Yahya and aI-Idrisi. In 1912 Rida would also meet Mubarak al-Sabah, the shaykh of Kuwait, Shaykh Khaz‘al, the ruler of Muhammara, and the Emir of Mascut and persuaded them on the necessity of establishing an independent Arab state.

Following the Ottoman defeats in the Libyan war (1911) and the Balkan wars (1912-1913), Rida published a pamphlet calling for solidarity and unity of Arabs for the salvation of their land and defending the might of Islam. The pamphlet was targeted at the amirs and the Arab leaders of Hijaz, Najd, Yemen, and the tribes of the Arabian Peninsula and the Persian Gulf. It warned them of impending European plots to gain control of Syria and the shores of the Arabian Peninsula as a first stage; followed by the occupation of Islamic holy cities and transportation of sacred Islamic relics to the Museums in Europe. Rida urged the Arab leaders to awaken and cease their internal feuds.

Rida had concluded that the "Europeanized" Ottoman Empire was impossible to be reformed, since it was solely dependent on Europe. For Rida, Ottoman statesmen were drenched deep in a "European complex" that they neglected the security of both the Arabs and even the Turks in Asia. Ottoman Europe was draining Ottoman resources to such an extent that the state failed to defend both its European and Asiatic territories. He proposed the authorities to transfer Istanbul into a purely military outpost and shift the capital either to Damascus or the Anatolian city of Konya. Arabs and Turks should join then in creating "local Asiatic military formations" capable of defending themselves in case of foreign danger. Priority should be given to defending the Hijaz and the two holy sanctuaries in Mecca and Medina and the lands adjacent to them.

Beginning from 1912, Rida would play an important leadership role in Decentralist political factions. The Egyptian nationalists, especially the Watan party, attacked “the Society of the Arab Union”(Jam‘iyyat ul-lttihad al-Arabi) as a conspiracy that sought conflict with the Turks, secession of Arab countries from the Ottoman Empire, and establish an Arab Caliphate. The allegations would be denied by Rida. Simultaneously, Rida began making sharp public attacks against the CUP. Rida believed that the party aimed to "intermix the nations of the Empire with the Turkish race". Initially, the society had limited themselves to achieve unity between the rulers of the Arabian Peninsula and defending the Arab countries from the Committee of Union and Progress. However, Rida would later explicitly advocate for Arab secessionism from the Ottoman Empire.

1913 coup d'état 

In 1913, CUP members would launch a coup to establish a one-party state under a de facto triumvirate of the "Three Pashas"(Enver Pasha, Talaat Pasha and Djemal Pasha). During the years of World War, both Arabists and Salafis were persecuted harshly by Jamal Pasha, the CUP leader who held military and civilian powers in Syria. Many Arabists would be court-martialed and executed, and many Salafi scholars exiled. This would lead to prominent Salafis such as Tahir al-Jaza'iri and Rashid Rida to support the British-backed Arab revolt led by Sharif Hussain. Harshly condemning the 1913 coup, Rida denounced the Young Turks as the “enemy of Arabs and of Islam" who sought the degrading of Arabs. In a radical shift from his early activism focused on educational reforms based on the salafi model, by 1913 Rida had started organizing against the Ottoman government. He espoused the movement to establish a new Islamic pan-Arab empire which would include the Arabian Peninsula, Syria and Iraq.

It was during this period that Rashid Rida would join the ranks of Ibn Saud's boosters in the Arab World. Later on, this shift in stance was further accelerated by his resentment and disenchantment by the betrayal of Sharif Hussein and the scheming of Western colonial powers in the post-war era. Rida saw in Ibn Saud a strong Muslim ruler who had the vision and resolve to prevent British imperial designs in the Arab World. Rida's active promotion of Najdi da'wa was in direct contradiction to Abduh's denunciation of that movement.

On the eve of World War I, on 27 March 1914, Rashid Rida publicly alleged in Al-Manar that the CUP was assisting the Zionists in Palestine. He began to vocally participate in the Decentralist opposition to Zionists. Rida accused the Zionists of seeking to establish a Jewish state from "Palestine to the Euphrates" and warned that if the Zionists achieved their objectives; not a single Muslim would remain in "the Promised Land" of the Jewish tradition. To confront the Zionist threat in Palestine, Rida prescribed:"deliberation, determination, communal strength,... acts and deeds, not talk and words" against the Jewish settlers declaring that "the time for action has come". Calls from prominent pan-Arab activists for violence against Jewish colonies accompanied by Rashid Rida's declaration of direct action were readily answered in Palestine. In the months before World War 1, youths across the towns in Palestine began taking organized steps to oppose the Zionists. Al-Manar would become a chief source for spreading Arab anti-semitic tropes; portraying Jews as those who controlled the finances of the European powers.

World War Era 

During World War I, Rashid Rida's activities primarily involved negotiating with the British and Sharif Husayn of Mecca, persuading them on the issue of establishing a united pan-Islamic state, with autonomy for different regions, in the scenario of an eventual collapse of the Ottoman Empire. His attitudes towards the British had been reserved and always suspected them of holding hidden ambitions in Arab countries. These suspicions became stronger after the British ignored his war-time appeals and were verified when he learned about the Sykes-Picot agreement to divide the Arab provinces of the Ottoman Empire between Britain and France. Since Rida identified the well-being of the Arabs with that of Islam, he considered Britain's actions as dangerous and hostile to not just Arabs, but all Muslims.

Aftermath of the War 
The injustice and humiliation imposed upon Muslims by the post-World War Order crafted by the Allied Powers and the betrayal of Sharif Husyan and his sons would lead to a radical phase of Rida's Pan-Islamist enterprise. He became a key figure in the transformation of Islamist politics in both Syria and Egypt, towards militant anti-Westernism. Hasan Al-Banna was a regular attendee of Rida's lectures in the mid-1920s. Rida stubbornly withheld any more attempts at mediation with Western powers and would turn vehemently anti-British. Viewing the Versailles peace treaty and its succeeding World order as worse than the War itself, Rida condemned democracy as a colonial deceit and proposed a Universal Islamic System as a substitute for the failed Wilsonian Peace.

Rida had already become an ardent advocate of Sunni revivalism through the theological framework of Hanbalism. He supported the militant Wahhābī movement in Central Arabia; a movement he considered as tied to his Salafīyya theology and committed himself to its defence. Rashid Riḍā was opposed to later developments of mystical thoughts and practices in Islam, and hence, was attracted by Wahhābī doctrines that called for "a pristine Islam" with a total rejection of sainthood and superstitions. He regularly attacked what he viewed as ‘spiritual dangers’ of the mystic orders that led to the neglect of the Qurʾān and Sunna. Riḍā’ believed that the neglect of religious duties by Ṣūfīs and their pacifist teachings led to weakness of the Islamic society and the corruption of the Ummah. Politically, Riḍā aligned himself with the Sultanate of Najd and publicly supported Ibn Saʿūd's military campaigns (1902-1934), seeing him as the only ruler capable of expelling the treacherous Sharif Ḥusayn from Ḥijāz and challenging the British.

Life as a Scholar

Dar al-Da'wa Wal Irshad (1912 - 1918) 
Rashid Rida managed a short-lived, yet influential, Islamic seminary known as Dar al-Da'wa wal Irshad (“The House of Invitation and Guidance”) during 1912–1918. It was an international institution which accommodated students from all parts of the Islamic World. Although it was forced to close-down due to financial difficulties and political turbulence of World War 1, the seminary would produce many prominent Islamic scholars and inspire future Islamic educational institutions.

Trip to India (1912) 

Shibli Nomani, the principal of the subcontinental Nadwat-ul-Ulama had invited Rashid Rida to Dar al-Ulum in 1912. Nadwat-ul-Ulama had set goals that were fully compatible with those of the Arab Salafiyya. Rida delivered two speeches in the Darul Uloom Nadwat ul-ʿulamāʾ in Lucknow. He also met several influential Ahl-i Hadith scholars on the occasion.

Upon his visit to Nadwat al-Ulama, Rida also visited Dar al-Ulum Deoband. During his stay, Deobandi scholar Sayyid Anwar Shah Kashmiri gave an Arabic lecture on Qur'an, Hadith, Hanafite fiqh, methodology of Deobandi school, its intellectual background and the thought of Indian Islamic revivalist Shah Wali Allah Dehlawi. Amazed by the speech, Rida praised Anwar Shah Kashmiri and his Hanafi thought. After returning to Egypt, Rida wrote in Al-Manar, praising Deoband:

Revival of Salafi Theology 
In 1905, Rashid Rida spoke of the Salafis (al-Salafiyya) as a collective noun in distinction with the Ash'aris in a theological sense. He would also refer to "Wahhabis" as Salafis. In the same year, Al-Manar published an article entitled “Speculative Theology is a bid‘a According to the Pious Predecessors.” He also wrote about the importance of following the salaf in their promotion of ḥadīth science – a position he promoted consistently during the succeeding years. Identifying Islamic revival as synonymous with the spread of hadith sciences, Riḍā saw a return to the proof-texts and mastery of various hadith disciplines as the sole remedy for reviving the madhab Al-Salaf(doctrines of the Salaf).

In 1912, Salafi scholars Muhibb al Din al Khatib and Abd al Fattah Al Qatlan began to work together with Rashid Rida. Their Salafiyya Bookstore was relocated to join the famous Manar Bookstore (Maktabat al-Manar) run by Rashid Rida.

In 1914, Rida defined mad'hab al-salaf as “nothing other than to act according to the Qur'an and the sunnah without any accretion, in the way that [the salaf] understood [Islam] at its inception.” Like his contemporary Islamic reformers and acolytes such as Mahmud Shukri Al Alusi, Jamal al Din al Qasimi in Damascus; Rashid Rida also advanced Salafi theology as an integral part of his revivalist endeavours. Rida was critical of all kinds of speculative interpretation (ta'wil) which went beyond what he considered as the apparent/literal meaning of the text of the Scriptures. Despite having been influenced by Ghazali in his youth, Rida criticised Ghazali's works due to the practice of ta'wil and mystical interpretation of the injunctions of the sharia. Similar to the medieval theologian Ibn Taymiyya, Rida directed a much sharper criticism against Ibn Arabi, for his metaphysical doctrine of Wahdat al Wujud.

Rashid Riḍā believed that only the ḥadīth specialists were endowed with the proper capability to revive the Sunna. From 1915,  he began constantly emphasizing that the scholars of the early Ahl al-hadith school were the ones who preserved the religion by resisting threats of heretical innovations. Hence, the methods of the Muhaddithoon in scrutinizing and using ḥadīth reports in law and creed had to be revived and followed in the society. Later in the 1920s, Rida and his students would proclaim themselves as following a "Salafi approach" in jurisprudence, thereby widening Salafi paradigm to impact the realm of law.

These Salafi reformers pereceived Athari theology as more rational than speculative theology. Rashid Rida defended Hanbalite condemnation of Kalam, asserting that Hanbali theology had stronger orthodox religious foundations and defended conservative Islamic values from Western and secular ideologies more effectively. Rida stressed to his fellow disciples that Salafi theology was simple for the masses to acknowledge since it is like "walking on a straight path"; whereas studying Ash'ari theology amounted to "swimming in a deep sea, where one has to struggle against the waves of philosophical doubts and the currents of theoretical investigation".

Although Rida believed that Ijtihad was unlawful in the realm of 'Aqidah (Islamic theology), he sought to tone down the religious hostiltites between Salafis, Asharis and Maturidis; as well as between Sunnis, Ibadis, Shi'is, etc. He called upon all Muslims to unite by taking the pious forebears (Salaf al-Salih) as their role models. Early issues of al-Manar emphasized the virtues of the Salaf and also extolled their feats; such as their intellectual dynamism and especially the early Islamic conquests. Rida believed that the period of the early Muslim community  epitomized pristine Islam to its perfection.

Revival of Salafi Legal Theory 

From the medieval period, Sunni scholars had used the label Salafi, to denote Muslims who professed Athari theology. Prior to the 1920s, when Salafi circles used the terms mad'hab al Salaf and Salafiyya, they usually retained its theological meaning. This was how first Rida understood and used Salafi epithets. Late 19th century Salafi scholars such as Nu'man al Alusi and Mahmud Shukri Al Alusi also described Salafis (al-salafiyyun) as those who accept the Divine attributes without explaining them rationally or falling into anthropomorphism. Najdi scholars such as Abd al-Rahman ibn Hasan and Abd al-Latif ibn Abd al-Rahman too spoke of Salafi beliefs in the same way. Both Rida and his fellow Syrian reformer, Jamal al-Din al-Qasimi, referred to Salafis as Sunni Muslims who adopted Athari theology and rejected the allegorical interpretation of God's attributes. Yet on a few occasions before the 1920s, both Rida and Qasimi had used these terms in loose ways that would have puzzled an attentive reader.

From the 1920s onwards, Rida and his disciples would conceptually expand "Salafiyya" in a legal sense. In 1924, Rida described himself in the following terms: “I am a Salafi Muslim; I do not blindly follow any particular religious scholar and am not a partisan of any particular mujtahid.” Rida claimed to directly use scriptural proofs on legal issues, as the Salaf had done. Rida's disciples too began promoting the term in the same way. In promoting the non-madhab or pre-madhab approach to Islamic law of the Salaf, Rida and his followers, however, didn't dismiss the system of classical Fiqh. They maintained that all four schools of law were virtuous and promoted reconciliation between them, while condemning sectarianism between schools.

Evolution of Salafiyya after Rida

Later Years 
The "Enlightenment Salafism" of Jamal al-Din Afghani and Muhammad 'Abduh did not partake of the literalist theology of Ibn Taymiyya. Rather, Abduh and Afghani were rationalist Ash'aris. The Abduh-Afghani school, however, was similar to Ibn Taymiyya and Ibn Qayyim on legal principles such as importance of Ijtihad to interpret textual sources. However, they weren't literalists and did not promote unconditional authority of hadiths. After the death of his mentor Abduh, Rashid Rida moved closer to traditional Salafi teachings and was seriously involved in editing and publishing of works of Ibn Taymiyya and like-minded scholars. Throughout his writings in Al-Manar and other works, he began espousing traditional Salafi legal and theological positions. Scholars such as Muhammad Hamid al-Fiqi drew Rida closer to the scholars of Najd and away from the rationalism of Abduh. Rida, adopting a Hadith-centric approach in his methodology would also associate with the Ahl-i-Hadith movement of the Indian subcontinent. Rida and Ahl-i-Hadith scholars would co-publish books propagating Salafi principles.

Advocacy of Wahhabism 

Rashid Rida developed favourable views towards Wahhabis upon his arrival in Egypt in the 1890s; after reading about the movement in the histories of Al-Jabartī and Al-Nāṣiri. Thus, as early as the 1900s, Rashid Rida had hailed Ibn Saud's victories during the Saudi-Rashidi wars. A few years before Abduh's death, the term “Salafiyya” discretely found its way into Rashid Rida's seminal journal Al-Manār. At first, Rida understood the word in a narrow theological sense and used it as an adjective that characterized the unique creed of the pious ancestors (ʿaqīda wāḥida salafiyya), which he openly equated with Hanbali theology. In a 1913 article, he declared that Najd, the heart of today's Saudi Arabia, was the region in which Salafi theology was the most widespread. However, during this stage, Rida had noted that "the Wahhabis were overcome with harshness (jafāʾ) and exaggeration (ghuluw) and were not “moderate” like the other Salafis in Iraq, the Hijaz, Greater Syria, and Egypt". In Rida's mind, moderation (iʿtidāl) was a defining characteristic of the school of Salafiyya.

After the First World War, Rashid Rida no longer saw the 'tradition-bound' ulama, but rather, the rising class of Westernizing Muslim intelligentsia as his main opponents. Thus, Rida would become the most enthusiastic stalwart of Wahhabism. In 1919, he published Muhammad Ibn 'Abd al-Wahhab's Kashf al-Shubuhat (Removal of Doubts); and by 1920, Rida had begun extolling ibn ‘Abd al-Wahhab as a Mujadid of Islam in Nejd. Were it not for the excessive zeal of some of his supporters, and the conspiracies of his adversaries, Rida argued; the Wahhabi movement could have expanded and led Islamic revival all across the Islamic World. In 1922 Rashid Rida distributed a volume of essays containing writings by Ibn Taymiyya, Ibn Qudama, and Ibn Rajab; reportedly after payment from a Najdi merchant. This would stir a theological controversy between the Sufi and Salafi factions of Syria. For Rashid Rida, Salafiyya came to symbolise religious fervour and puritanical revival of old Islamic practices. The thrust to return to the ways of the pious ancestors (Salaf) was also combined with doctrines of Arab pre-eminence. This also made him a committed supporter of Saudi military expansions and Wahhabi revival.

By rejecting taqlid, and going back beyond the founders of the Madh'habs to the early community of the Salaf, Rashïd Ridā and his followers would gravitate towards the Hanbalite reformist outlook of Ibn Taymiyya, with other scholarly influences like those of Al-Ghazāli getting rapidly replaced. As the most vocal medieval theologian who condemned Sufi innovations and heresies, Ibn Taymiyya exemplied the most authoritative classical scholar to the Al-Manar party. While politically pan-Islamist, in its social program Salafiyya was being increasingly be characterized by Puritanism and was facing opposition from conservative quarters like Al-Azhar. Meanwhile, they found support from other quarters with the revival of Wahhabism in Arabia and the Ahl-i Hadith movement in India, all of whom condemned Sufi innovations and saint-cults and looked up to Ibn Taymiyya as the greatest medieval scholar.

Saudi-Hejazi Conflicts 
Following a series of catastrophic events in the aftermath of the World War, such as the ongoing Partition of the Ottoman Empire, the French occupation of Syria in 1920, the loss of Iraq and Greater Syria to the Mandatory Powers, the triumph of secular Kemalists in Turkey, the abolition of the Sultanate and the caliphate in 1922 and 1924 respectively; Rashid Rida's militant opposition to the European powers had reached its peak by the 1920s. He responded to these challenges by proposing a comprehensive pan-Islamist thesis in his famous book "al-Khilafa aw al-Imama al-‘Uzma" (The Caliphate or the Exalted Imamate), published in 1922. He called upon Muslims to rally behind the banners of their shared Islamic faith; shun the emerging nationalist currents, and stressed the role of Arab leadership in unifying Muslim ranks. Of utmost importance to his agenda was thwarting British imperialist goals in the Arabian peninsula. Although he greatly admired 'Abd al-Aziz and the religiosity of Wahhabis, he urged Sharif Husayn and Ibn Saud not to fight each other as late as 1919, and unite in the face of the colonial threat. Through the pages of Al-Manar, Rida regularly called for Islamic unity against the European threat.

However, Sharif Husayn's rejection of Rida's overtures and his continued privileged relations with the British and the French would make Rida publicly condemn Husayn. By the 1920s, Husyan had taken control of Hejaz with British-backing and his sons Faysal and Abdallah were granted the Protectorates of Iraq and Transjordan; respectively. Rashid Rida castigated Sharif Husayn and his sons for their dynastic schemings in collusion with the colonial powers to betray their own people. For Rida, the king of the Hijaz was nothing more than a sellout and a pawn of the British Empire in their oppression of Arabs and Muslims. By 1923, Rida had begun to publicly call upon the Arabian emirs to free Hejaz from the Hashemite rule. Rida viewed Ibn Saud of the Sultanate of Najd as the most suitable candidate for this task, not only because he favoured the Wahhabis as the best hope for Arab and Islamic renaissance; but also because of their promising military-political capabilities to bring stability and security to the Hijaz, and defend it from any European imperial aggressions. In stark contrast to the Hashemite family, Ibn Saud and his faithful Wahhabi followers were pious Muslims striving to apply orthodoxy and orthopraxy in keeping with the doctrines of the Salaf al-Salih and hence the leadership of holy places of Islam was incumbent upon them. Two days after the Turkish Abolition of Caliphate, Sharif Husayn proclaimed himself as Caliph of Muslims in March 1924, initiating controversy across the Islamic World. Denouncing his proclamation as illegitimate due to his dependence on the British and his betrayal of Muslims, Rida condemned Sharif Husayn's declaration as a desecration of Islam and viewed him as a Mulhid (heretic) who was dangerous to the entire Ummah.

Saudi Conquest of Hejaz (1924 - 1925) 
In the Arabian Peninsula, the Wahhabi revival led by the expanding Sultanate of Najd had led to military clashes with the Hashemite Kingdom of Hijaz by 1924. Since the Hashemites also ruled Iraq and Transjordan, the struggle for Hijaz assumed pan-Arab as well as global pan-Islamic dimensions; due to the significance of the Islamic Holy Cities. Throughout the Islamic World, the Sharīf was regarded with increasing disdain. Rida would wholeheartedly champiom 'Abdul Aziz Ibn Saud's Hejaz campaigns during 1924-1925 through Al-Manar, viewing the nascent Saudi state as the best hope for Islamic Renaissance and portrayed it as the last major bastion of Islamic resistance to the colonial order. In August 1924, Ibn Sa’ud launched a final, decisive offensive against the Hijaz and, following his defeat in the Battle of Mecca in December, Husayn was forced to abdicate. Rida enthusiastically welcomed the conquest of Mecca by the Sultanate of Najd, portraying it as a historic event and a long-yearned opportunity for Muslims to recover the lost Islamic glory. Within a few years, 'Abd al-Azeez ibn Saud had united Hejaz and Northern Arabia, gained international recognition and prestige; and his saga had become a success-story and an Islamic alternative to Atatürk in Turkey. King 'Abd al-'Aziz's greatness, independence, and religiosity combined with his pragmatic promotion of technology to develop his state, exemplied balanced reform to Rashid Rida.

Rashid Rida vocally defended the new Saudi regime from its Muslim and non-Muslim detractors; proclaiming that the Wahhabis were "the best Muslims" who stayed true to the doctrines of Imam Ahmad Ibn Hanbal, one of the four celebrated patronyms of Sunni legal schools, and the well-known Hanbalite reformer Ahmad ibn Taymiyyah. Making anti-Shi'ism "a major trait of his school", Rida would defend the Wahhabi demolition of the shrines of Al-Baqi, and fiercely denounced those Shi'ites who were outraged by it, condemning them as "Raafidites" who were the instruments of Persians. Through his articles in Al-Manar, Rida hailed the Saudi conquest as a sensational moment in Islamic history, declaring it as:

Ibn Saud came to represent everything Rida had expected from a just Muslim Sultan. He rebutted all the circulating rumours regarding the Wahhabis desecrating graves, slaughtering women and children in their conquests etc.; condemning them as "British propaganda". In reality, Rida clarified, Wahhabis restored Islamic rule to the Holy city of Mecca and guaranteed that Hejaz would not have to go through the oppression of despotic rulers in the future. Praising Ibn Saud as a model Islamic ruler that the post-Ottoman Muslim world needed, Rida wrote:

Great Syrian Revolt (1925 - 1927) 

Rida's subsequent political efforts focused on two fronts: campaign for Syrian independence and support for Ibn Sa‘ud's efforts to unify the Arabian Peninsula. When the Great Syrian Rebellion broke out in 1925, Rida and the Syro-Palestinian Congress provided it full support, with financial backing from the nascent Saudi state. However, by 1927,  the rebellion had been crushed and the nationalist factions of Syro-Palestinian Congress parted ways with Rida, seeking compromise with the British and French. Rida vehemently objected to this and further strengthened ties to Ibn Saud's government, which he regarded as the only sovereign Islamic government that stood up to the colonial powers and guarded the holiest sites in Islam. He was also active in Pan-Islamist organisations that sought to rally Muslim peoples against the European imperial powers. Fearing the influence of Rashid Rida across the Islamic World and his connections to the Saudis, the British Intelligence in Cairo closely followed Rida's activities.

World Islamic Congresses (1926) 
As the new ruler of Hejaz, 'Abd al-Azeez ibn Saud convened a Pan-Islamic Congress in Mecca in June–July 1926; with the objectives of international Islamic recognition of Saudi rule of Hejaz, consultations on Hajj (pilgrimage) services, and also to erase the past reputation of sectarianism associated with the Wahhabis. (A few years later, Ibn Saud would wage a military campaign against the Ikhwan rebels, who were notorious for their fanaticism across the Islamic World, signalling the future religious reforms to transpire. Rashid Rida would enthusiastically back their elimination) Rida was the most prominent delegate of the Congress, who was entrusted as the organiser of the conference. Ibn Saud charged Rida with convening the conference on his behalf, drafting the conference protocols and writing the king's opening address. In his private capacity, Rida would also support the stances of Ibn Saud and the Saudi delegates. Earlier, Rida had been an important delegate in the preparatory subcommittee for the 1926 Islamic Congress for Caliphate held in Cairo, which declared that the Caliphate was still possible. However he was not an active participant in the Cairo Congress itself and considered the organizers to be inefficient; privately predicting doom for the Congress due to its lack of resolve and irreconciliable sectarian-political differences. Meanwhile, Rida was enthusiastic about the Meccan Congress and became its most prominent advocate. Delegates of Islamic religious organisations and Muslim governments across the World attended the Congress. Rida pressed for a collective oath of the Congress delegates, pledging to rid the Arabian Peninsula of all foreign influences. Far exceeding the initial references of the Congress, Rida also proposed an Islamic Pact (mithal Islami) between Muslim governments, envisioning the assembly as a precursor to a league of Muslim Nations.  However, no significant resolutions could be passed and no subsequent congress in Mecca was ever held due to the prevalence of deep religious, doctrinal and political differences across the Muslim world. Despite this, with prominent figures like Grand Mufti of Jerusalem Hajji Amin al-Husseini in attendance, the conference marked the consolidation of the alliance between Pan-Islamists and the leaders of the new Wahhabi state.

Rida would publish a treatise "The Wahhabis and Hijaz" wherein he set forth the case for Wahhabi rule over Hejaz. The treatise condemned Sharif Husayn and his family for their selling of Arab lands in complicity with the agenda colonial powers; for the sake of their personal dynastic ambitions. Rida warned in his treatise about the British manipulations across the region to dominate the region and subjugate Muslims. Defending the religious credentials of Wahhabis, Rashid Rida cited Tarikh Najd, a treatise composed by 'Abd Allah ibn Muhammad Aal-al Shaykh, the son of Muhammad Ibn 'Abd al Wahhab. He asserted that Wahhabis had sincere zeal for the Islamic faith and were amongst the most hostile to foreign influences. Rida presented their leader Ibn Saud as the strongest and the most capable Islamic leader who would stand up to the British imperial programme. The notion that Western powers colluded with their Arab client-states to dominate Muslim lands and secularise them would become a pillar of subsequent Islamic revivalist movements. The oldest and most influential of these movement would be the Ikhwan al-Muslimeen (Muslim Brotherhood), founded by the Egyptian school teacher Hasan al-Banna in 1928, who was influenced by Rashid Rida's ideas.

Rehabilitation of Wahhabis 
Although Rida defended the Wahhabis passionately, he had often acknowledged the adverse effects of Najdi zeal and acknowledged the existence of fierce exaggerators (ghulat) amongst the Najdis and their zealotry due to general state of Jahl (ignorance). However, he strove to downplay their importance by stressing that King Abd al-Aziz was a reasonable man. In Rida's view, it was better to judge the Najdis based on their pragmatic and moderate political leader or to accept the fact that some fanaticism was better for the Ummah than the erosion of Islamic identity. While he acknowledged the religious militancy of the Najdis, he considered their attitude to be better than the resignation and undeclared defeatism of other Muslims. Even though he defended the Wahhabi movement against its critiques and despite his embracal of Hanbali legal principles, he had found his Hanbali counterparts in Saudi Arabia to be unaware of modern developments, a point that he conveyed to them.

As an exponent of Athari theology, Rida had argued that allegorical interpretations of the scriptures (ta'wil) were sometimes appropriate because without them many Muslims would have abandoned their religion. Due to pressures of the modern era; the message of Islam needed to be articulated in a way that was consistent with scientific discourses. He took it upon himself to counsel the Najdi scholars on the necessity of balanced reform and mailed them copies of Tafsir al-Manar for learning. In a letter addressed to Abdul Rahman al Sa'adi (d. 1957), the teacher of the famous Salafi scholar Ibn 'Uthaymin (d. 2001), Rida advised:

When news of Ibn Bulayhid, a Najdi scholar who clashed with Rida's Salafi disciples in Hejaz over the former's beliefs in flat earth, were spreading, Rida sought to control damaging rumours. Other prominent Wahhabi scholars such as Muhammad ibn 'Abd al-Latif Al al-Shaykh would intervene on behalf of Rida's disciples and refute Ibn Bulayhid to affirm the sphericity of earth. In an Al-Manar article about education and the dangers of stagnation, Rida criticized flat-earthers and enemies of science. He insisted that the scholars of Najd could not be counted among these ignoramuses and that rumors to the contrary verged on absurdity:

However, by 1926, any references to the "excessive zeal" of some of the Wahhabis had disappeared.  The initial failure of the Wahhabi movement was blamed on the corrupt Ottomans and on the plots of “the country of the Satanic ruses” (i.e. the British empire). Saluting Ibn ‘Abd al-Wahhab  as “the Mujaddid of the twelfth century” who taught the people of Najd the proper understanding of Tawḥīd as expounded by Ibn Taymiyya, Rida hailed his movement as one of "reform and renewal" (al-iṣlāḥ waʾl-tajdīd). He implored the followers of his Islah Movement to support the Wahhabis against the three hazards that threatened the Ummah from within: i) the “Shi‘a fanatics”; ii) the "grave-worshippers” (i.e., the Sufis) and iii) the “Westernised preachers of atheism". Wahhabi ulema would directly collaborate with Rida to publish their works through Rida's Al-Manar publishing house. During the 1920s, Al-Manar would publish over two dozen Wahhabi works, which included fatwas refuting the Ikhwan. Most notably, Rida would compile the famous collection of texts titled Majmūʿat al-rasāʾil waʾl-masāʾil al-Najdiyya (“The Compendium of Najdī Epistles and Responsa”); and publish it in Cairo as four volumes. Another major work published by Rida was the book Majmuʿat al-tawhid al-najdiyya (Monotheistic Collection from Najd), a package of texts compiling the writings of the most prominent Wahhabi scholars of the past.

By 1927, throwing his adversaries off-balance, Rida asserted that "Wahhabis" had become a large group in Egypt, with adherents among the religious scholars of Al-Azhar University and other religious institutions; assisted by the popularity of Islahi ideals of al-Manar. Openly claiming that his journal promoted a "Wahhabi" approach to Islam was a bold and ironic way of siding with the Najdis while making the point that they did not deserve to be stigmatized. Rida had already started to adopt some of the Wahhabis' more uncompromising attitudes to religious reform. Rida's opponents accused that his transformation to be the official spokesman for the Wahhabites was due to the financial assistance he received from Ibn Saud. However, Rida justified himself by stating that it was his scholarly research and extensive knowledge, that propelled him to defend Wahhabism.

Reformed "Wahhabism" 

Despite the mixed results of the rehabilitation campaign and the difficulties that some of his disciples encountered, Rida remained devoted to King ʿAbd al-ʿAzīz until the very end. For all his occasional faults, the Saudi ruler was, in the eyes of Rida, the best available Muslim statesman, and his kingdom offered the best prospect of becoming the political arm of the balanced Islahi movement. Past experience had made Rida recognise the realistic difficulties of putting his ideal reformist efforts into practice: it required money as well as political support. The strong relationship between Riḍā and ʿAbd al-ʿAzīz would also facilitate the movement of several of Riḍā's disciples to the Ḥijāz in the 1920s. Assisted by Ibn Saud, their efforts would also mark the shift from the exclusivist, narrow-minded Classical Wahhabism prone to Takfirism; to a new reformed Wahhabi tradition open to outside world. The revived Wahhabi movement was more tolerant and no longer hostile to the surrounding populations, unlike its earlier iterations.

Rida's endorsement of Wahhabism would be a decisive factor in the spread of its influences beyond the kingdom's borders. Wahhabi scholars would consistently emphasize their affinity to mainstream Sunni legal schools and affirm that their tradition was amongst the several manifestations of the Islamic reform movement of Salafiyya. To further mainstreamise and refine Wahhabism; 'Abdul Aziz would also encourage the Saudi ulema to tone down their dogmatic views. Rida's disciples in Hejaz would make significant efforts to reform Wahhabis towards Salafiyya. One of the biggest efforts towards reintegration of Wahhabism into the mainstream Sunni World was through the establishment of Dar al-Tawhid ("The House of Unity"), a religious educational institute in Ta’if headed by Muhammad Bahjat al Bitar, a disciple of Rashid Rida. Another disciple Muhammad Hamid al-Fiqi, would be appointed as the president of the Meccan Department of Printing and Publication (raʾīs shuʿbat al-ṭabʿ wa-l-nashr bi-Makka). Based on the advise of Rida, Al-Fiqi would start a new Islamic journal Al-Islah in Mecca, modelled after Al-Manar. Al-Islah championed the key doctrines of Salafiyya and integrated Arabia into the transnational network of Islamic reformist efforts while fostering a broader sense of Islamic identity amongst the Arab elite.

Aftermath 
During the 1920s, Sayyid Rashid Rida and his Salafi disciples formed Young Men's Muslim Association (YMMA); an influential Islamist youth organisation that spearheaded attacks against liberal ideas and Western cultural trends. The establishment of Saudi rule over Hejaz marked a landmark event in the history of the Arab world in particular and the Islamic world in general. The alliance of Rida and the Wahhabi state laid the foundational coalitions of a fundamentalist Pan-Islamist movement, a new Sunni orthodoxy, with direct support from Saudi Arabia since 1926. Inspired by the theological paradigm elaborated by Rashid Rida, his disciple Hasan al-Banna founded the Society of the Muslim Brothers (Jama'at al-Ikhwan al-Muslimeen) in 1928; which Rida himself was on the verge of joining shortly before his death. The Muslim Brotherhood would become the most influential movement of Pan-Islamism across the Arab world. The successful establishment of an Islamic state in heartland of Islam significantly advanced the proliferation of the Islamic revivalist programme envisioned by Rashid Rida.

With the consolidation of Saudi rule, the Sufi institutions in Mecca were closed and replaced with Rashid Rida's Salafi comrades and the Najdi ulema. Sufi influence was being curtailed and Salafiyya movement was being promoted on an international scale. In 1961, the Islamic University of Medina was founded and it would serve as an international seminary for propagation of Salafi Da'wa (preaching) globally, with co-ordination of leading Salafis all over the world. Vast majority of its students came outside Saudi Arabia with wide-ranging scholarships. After graduation, these students would return to their native lands with prestige and would get appointed as imams, leaders, etc. or found Da'wa organisations of their own.

Death

Rashid Rida died on his way back to Cairo from Suez, where he had gone to see off his patron, King of Saudi Arabia Abdulaziz Ibn Saud. Rida had committed most of his resources for Islamic reform through publishing and other revivalist efforts. Hence, he faced financial difficulties throughout his career and he died poor and in debt.

The Sheikh of Al Azhar, Mustafa al Maraghi, remarked that Rida had three main opponents:  Muslim modernists, non-Muslims, and religious obscurantists.

Habib Jamati said in his eulogy: 
Egyptian hadith scholar and Rida's disciple, Ahmad Shakir wrote:

Views

On tawhid 
Rida's vision of tawhid formed the central theme of his reformist teachings. Rida believed that tawhid in was supported by rationality and opposed all forms of superstitious beliefs, oppression and ignorance. Holding firmly to the essence of tawhid enabled the first three generations of Muslims (Salaf) to build a just and mighty civilization. The later Muslims' deviation from pure tawhid, Rida argued, led to their decline and subjugation. Echoing Ibn Taymiyyah, Rida also condemned the practice of tawassul as bid'ah (religious innovation).

Through Al-Manar, Rida circulated tracts calling for the destruction of tombs and structures built above graves and the banning of practices associated with grave veneration which he condemned as shirk (polytheism). Among the various acts and beliefs Rida condemned as shirk are included:

 Worshipping creatures as deities besides God
 Believing that God grants part of his divine powers or share aspects of his dominion with the creation
 Believing in the lordship of God, yet directing acts of worship to worldy beings; such as seeking aid from the dead during sorrow and difficulties, seeking intercession by setting creatures as intermediaries between God and his creation, etc.

On tajdid
Rida believed that the early Muslims' upholding of tawhid and sunnah were the primary reason for their spiritual and material success. They were motivated by Quranic teachings which taught them to be independent, free from taqlid (blind adherence), and prepared them to spiritually and materially lead mankind. Thus they were able to establish a mighty civilisation unrivalled across the world with highly advanced science and technology and spread civilisation across all the lands they conquered, freeing its inhabitants from oppression and Jahiliyya(darkness). Rida believed that the Muslim decline started after the end of the Islamic Caliphates in the 13th century, when the Arab rule ceased and power shifted to the non-Arabs who abandoned the Sunnah and innovated various superstitions that contradicted the Scriptures. Based on his reading of hadith, Rida believed that after this decline, a second Islamic victory is prophesied. He undertook initiatives for a global Islamic Renaissance in that path.

Rida believed that the Muslim World faced acute crises in spiritual, educational and legislative affairs. He identified Islamic religious reform "as a triple unification of doctrine, law, and ethics." Rida's adoption of Wahhabiyyah's puritanical tenets after 1918 symbolised his adoption of a Hanbalite reformist framework, to carry out his revivalist efforts. While strictly adhering to Qur'an and Hadith, the Hanbali school called for the application of Ijtihad where the Scriptures are vague. It also accepted the general Islamic principle of Maslaha(public interest). In order to expound a comprehensive Islamic system of law, government, education, and ethics in the modern world; Rida revived the classical Islamic theory of life. The reconstitution of the Islamic system was only possible by directly returning to the original sources. In this, he also defended the superiority of naql (textual sources) over 'aql (rational sources) and condemned philosophy and tasawwuf.

Rashid Rida travelled to Europe only once, for a specific political purpose, and was ignorant of European languages. He disliked the social life of Europeans and was hostile to Christianity. Despite this, he had a robust sensitivity to challenges faced by Muslims in the modern world. He believed that the inner decay of Muslims as well as the efforts of Catholic Church, prevented Europeans from embracing Islam. He wanted Muslims to accept aspects of modernity only to the extent to which it was essential for the recovery of Islamic strength. By referring to the juristic principles of necessity, he considered it as a duty for Muslims to study modern sciences and technology. Rida repeatedly urged the legal experts and the Ulema of his era to come together and produce legal works based directly from Quran and hadith, easy for all believers to comprehend and in accordance with the needs of the age.

On taqlid
Rashid Rida was a leading exponent of Salafism and was especially critical of what he termed the "blind following" (taqlid) of excessive Sufism, which he believed to have distorted the original message of Islam. He distinguished between imitating a madhab and following Muhammad using the commendable term "following" (ittba), which denoted following the prophetic sunnah through textual proofs. He encouraged both laymen and scholars to read and study directly the primary sources of Islam by themselves. This principle also enabled Rida to address a number of contemporary subjects and challenges in a modern way, articulating his defense of Islam in a renovated language that sometimes led him to hold un-conventional views. Not only was taqlid inherently blameworthy, Rida also condemned its resultant factionalism, writing:

Condemning taqlid theologically, Rida argued that rigid adherence to the madhabs have divided the ummah into sectarian factions; almost causing the jurists to worship the four Imams like deities, which contradicted tawhid. Moreover, it blocked the independent thinking of Muslims and prohibited their right to access the scriptures directly, which enabled the tyrants, supported by the corrupt ʿulamaʾ (scholars), to justify oppression and preserve their despotism. He would also explain that the hadiths regarding the saved sect (al-firqa al-nājiya) referred to the ahl al-Ittiba (the people who followed proof-texts) who are the "saved ones" (al-Najin), while the madhab fanatics belonged to the innovated group. Despite this, Rida did not ignore the legacy of the four mad'habs and viewed their legal literature as a resource from which he derived rulings, adapting to changing circumstances. Although he placed the four imams at the peak of juristic excellence, he claimed that Ibn Taymiyya was practically more relevant for contemporary Muslims.

Rida's criticism of Taqlid extended well beyond the confines of Islamic law and theology to include socio-political developments. He believed that socio-political associations and its consequent Asabiyyah (partisanships) influenced madhab affiliations and fanaticism. He was far more critical of Al-Mutafarnijun (Europeanised emulators); whom he regarded as being guilty of Taqlid and abandoning the path of the Salaf (pious forefathers). While the madhab partisans are influenced by administrative positions of power and promote governmental interests; the Mutafarnijun create more damage by dividing the Ummah based on different languages, nationalities and countries and conceiving new identities within the nation-states. Labelling the Europeanisers who associated with new national identities as Mulhid (heretics) and Murtadd (apostates), Rida wrote:

Drawing on Hanbali and Shafi'i legal traditions that supported the continuity of Ijtihad, Rida also employed its doctrine into practice. Rida defined the application of Ijtihad strictly in terms of "pure adherence to the provisions of the Qur’an and Sunnah and upon the understanding of the Salaf al-Salih" and restricted its scope by enforcing the authority of 'Ijma (scholarly consensus). Rida's position on the scope of ijtihād would pave a middle-ground between the Modernist conceptualisation of ijtihād as an all-inclusive creative endeavour and the minimalist view of ijtihād which restricted it to a narrow legal spectrum of mad'hab partisanship. South Asian thinker Muhammad Iqbal (d. 1938) represented the former position, while the Deobandi movement advocated the latter. During his life-time when Taqlid tradition was predominant, fatwas were not issued by Ijtihad. Beginning from 1903, Rida issued fatwas in Al-Manar answering questions sent by readers from all corners of the Islamic World and proclaimed the fatwas as his Ijtihad (independent legal reasoning). His exceptional claim to exercise of Ijtihad would impart a major influence on future Islamic revivalist movements.

On Secularism and Modernism 
Rashid Rida believed that the management of state affairs and its principles were an integral part of Islamic faith. Accordingly, he called for the restoration of Islamic Caliphate and waged fierce battles against secularist trends that emerged across the Arab World during the early twentieth century. He denounced calls for separation of religion and state, advocated by some of the former students of Muhammad 'Abduh, as the most dangerous threat to Islam. By the 1920s,  Rida had discovered that his most formidable opponents were not the tradition-bound Sufi-Ash'arite ulama of Al-Azhar but the Western-educated secularists who pushed Abduh's utilitarian principles far beyond. Rida made vehement denunciations and attacks against modernists such as Ali Abdel Raziq and Ahmed Safwat. By this point, Rida's main priority had shifted to repeal what he considered "Western invasion of Islamic culture". This shift was also evident in his promotion of the Wahhabi cause and active promotion of Salafiyya, championing the works of Ibn Taymiyya, Ibn Qayyim, Ibn Qudama, etc.

Rida called upon Muslims to shun the imitation of foreigners and their ways, and labelled the Islamic modernists as “false renewers” and “heretics" whose efforts were harming Muslim societies. He would also severely arraign the scholars who provided fatwas (religious rulings) that aligned with the ideals of modernists. Rida asserted that a society which properly obeyed Sharia would be able to successfully resist both capitalism as well as the disorder of class-based socialism; since such a society would be unsusceptible to its temptations. The Westernising turn of Abduh's modernist disciples, was defied by Rida. He would propel towards the nascent Wahhabi state of Saudi Arabia and its Ulema. Rida despised the Westernising and secularising trends in Muslim societies and viewed them as the direct outcome of the modernist movement. Dismissing the modernist advocacy of cultural synthesis, he emphasized the self-sufficiency and comprehensiveness of Islamic faith, and adopted a hostile attitude towards Western powers; socially and politically. Rida's polemical posture against the modernists and themes of Islamic self-sufficiency, anti-Westernism, etc. would portend the emergence of transnational Islamist movements such as the Muslim Brotherhood and Jamaat-i Islami.

Rashid Rida believed that the rising individualism, irreligion, materialism, rationalization and cult of science in European societies after the World War were stepping stones to civilisational suicide. Hence, he adopted an antagonistic approach towards liberal ideas and was deeply suspicious of anything European. In his treatise Yusr al-Islam wa Usül at-Tashri' al-'Ämm (“The Accommodating Spirit of Islam and the Sources of General Jurisprudence”), Rida explains that he favors a "middle path" between madhab partisanship of religious obscurantists and Westernising approach adopted by modernists:

On Jews and Zionism

The Zionist programme to create a Jewish state in Palestine was a source of concern throughout the Islamic world during the early 20th century. Rashid Rida was one of the earliest scholarly critics of Zionism and wrote an article condemning the movement as early as 1898. Strongly chiding many Arabs for their silence and idleness regarding the Zionist question, Rida appealed:

Rida warned very early on that Jews were being mobilised by Zionists to migrate to Palestine with European approval. He urged the Arabs to wake up and take action against the Zionists. Quoting leaders of Zionist movement themselves, Rida warned that the goal of the movement was to establish a Zionist state in Palestine. Rida also directed critique against Jews in general. In his 1929 article “Thawrat Filistin” ("The Palestinian Revolution"), Rida propagated anti-semitic stereotypes. Rida claimed that Jews were a "selfish and chauvinist, cunning and perfidious" people who sought to exploit and exterminate other people. He alleged that Jews had plotted in Europe to undermine the power of the Roman Catholic Church  and introduced freemasonry, through which they manipulated the Bolsheviks and the Young Turks against the Russian and Ottoman empires respectively. Rida believed that capitalism was created by the Jews as a tool to "enslave the whole world through their money".

Rida regarded the Zionist enterprise as part of the wider British imperial scheme to consolidate their regional domination and provoke fitna (civil strife) amongst Muslims. In his 1929 treatise "Thawrat Filastin" ("The Palestinian Revolution"), Rida identified Jews as historically the most fanatical people in asabiyya (in-group solidarity), who refused to assimilate with other cultures. He listed a number of historical crimes of the Israelites such as their offenses against the prophets of Islam, their lapsing into shirk (polytheism), and riba (usury). According to Rida, God punished the Jews for these "crimes", taking away their kingdom and subjecting them to centuries of Christian persecution. Rida asserted that the Jews had gained immense influence in capitalist countries through their control of the Western banking system, and thus had succeeded in turning the Christian states against Muslims. According to Rida, the Jews were seeking the resurrection of their religious state in Palestine to pave the way for the arrival of their long-awaited Messiah, who in fact is the Anti-Christ, and who would be killed by the true Messiah, Jesus  as per the Islamic prophesies of the second coming of Jesus. Impatient with their endless wait, free-thinkers skeptical of religious eschatology had founded the Zionist movement. Since the Jews were only competent in financial sector, but not in military affairs, Rida argued, the Zionists were backed by the military might of British.

In 1933, Rida issued a fatwa forbidding all Muslims to sell land to Jews in Palestine, ruling that such sales represented the "betrayal of Islam" and complicity with Zionism. In response to a query from an Arab living in Berlin under the new Nazi regime, Rida propounded that the Germanic people had begun taking their vengeance upon the Jews for their roles in undermining Germany during the First World War. Although Rida's theology was ideologically at odds with Nazi doctrines, he nevertheless viewed them as sweeping away heresies and false beliefs, clearing the path for the ultimate triumph of the Islamic faith. He viewed Kemalism and Communism as the immediate enemies of Islam, both of which were directly threatening Muslim territories.

Fervent anti-Zionism linked with themes of Judeo-Bolshevism were a predominant component of Rida's writings until his death. He claimed that Jewish elites directed Freemasons and left-wing instigators to foment revolutions against religious governments across the world to spread atheism and communism. In the case of the Ottoman Empire, he identified Young Turks as the masonic fifth columnists; who were conspiring with Zionists in building a Jewish Kingdom of Zion in Palestine. Rida viewed Jewish elites as economically controlling Western nations through their domination of the capitalist banking system and believed that they were making efforts to generate a civilisational war between Islamic and Western worlds. Four months before his death, Rida paid a ringing tribute for his disciple Grand Mufti Hajji Amin al-Husayni; praising him as a brilliant Pan-Islamic Mujahid leader of Palestinians, and extolled his skillful efforts. In one of his final texts published in 1935, Rida called upon all Muslims to unite urgently and focus all their resources to defeat the Jews. In Rida's view:

On Christianity 
Rida was highly sensitive to the openly hostile and Islamophobic attitudes prevalent amongst Orientalists and European Christians of his era. Before promoting the vision of a Caliphate as a means of Islamic revival, Rida was trying to counteract the activities of Christian missionaries for founding a society to for organised Islamic Da'wa outside Ottoman territories. He was also concerned by what he regarded as sympathies of native Arab Christians to colonial powers. When he organised his Caliphate theory, his vision would have recognised both Judaism and Christianity, granting non-Muslims the right to serve in administration and judicial system.(except the Islamic shar'i courts)

In Rida's view, the only ‘true’ mission of solid faith in Christian history was that of the disciples of Jesus; and any later missionary attempt was false. Riḍā perceived the Christian missions as an integral part of the colonial presence in the Muslim world and was convinced that Europe made use of religion as a political instrument for mobilising European Christians by inflaming their ‘fanatic’ feelings against other nations. In spite of this, Rida did promote efforts to reconcile between Muslims and Christians.

However, Rida accused Oriental Christians in general of being the tools of colonial powers and of conspiring with "atheist Westerners" against Islam. In a series of articles published in 1911 compiled under the title al-Muslimun wa-l-qutb (The Muslims and the Copts), Rida condemned Muslims for dividing over nationalism. In his view, nationalist slogans were exploited by the colonial powers and would only favor the Coptic minority. He mocked the Copts’ claim to be descended from the “heathen, God-hating” Pharaohs and their demand to positions of power, responding that "they lack experience". Rida also applauded the 1911 Muslim congress organised as a response to Congress of Asyut in 1911 that demanded Coptic minority rights. Rida believed that the Western Civilisation could not be considered "Christian" but only materialistic, and predicted that its vices would lead to its self-destruction. He alleged that the West sought to turn Muslims away from their religion, either by degrading their moral values, or converting them to Christianity, or both.

On Shi'ism 

From being a person who was accommodative towards Shiism, Rashid Rida would gradually become a sharp critic of it. In a book originally published in 1929, he states that he was once willing to work with the balanced reformers amongst Shias, but explains that the situation has changed. He also alleged that Shiites "worship the dead" attributing to their intercessionary practices towards awliyaa in their shrines and called upon Shias to condemn these practices. Although he fell short of censuring all Shias, Rida left them few options. Pan-Islamic unity was still conceivable, but it had to be on Salafi terms. In 1927, in the context of heightened communal tensions following the Saudi's heavy-handed efforts on the Shi'i population of the kingdom, al-Manar published a series of seven anti-Shi'i articles written by the Salafi scholar and Rida's disciple Muhammad Taqi ud din al-Hilali. Rida condemned the Shia for "supporting the Tatar and Crusader invasions" and alleged that Raafidi doctrines were formulated by a Jewish-Zoroastrian conspiracy aimed at "perverting Islam and weakening the Arabs". Rida called upon "moderate Shi'is" to dissociate themselves from the stagnant Shia clergy and condemn intercessionary practices such as beseeching their religious figures from the Ahl al-Bayt and Awliyaa (saints) in their graves; which he equated with shirk (polytheism). Only then shall they be incorporated into his pan-Islamic ecumenical paradigm.

Despite all this, Rida was the most important modern Sunni scholar that influenced modern Shiite exegesis. Rida's prolific Quranic commentary (Tafseer) is regarded by both Sunni and Shiite scholars as groundbreaking in the field of Tafseer. As traditional Shiism came into contact with various Islamic reform movements, such as the salafiyya which emphasised the importance of adhering to "Qur'an and Sunnah" over personalities, its orthodox reluctance to engage in Qur'anic exegesis was highly challenged in the modern World. Rida's Tafseer and his innovative approach were important in inducing a similar tendency within Shiism.

Darwinism 
Although Rashid Rida personally rejected Darwin's theory of evolution, he did not outright denounce someone who expounded the theory as an unbeliever. Abduh had interpreted certain aspects of the story of Adam such as "questions of angels", "prostration of angels", "tree", etc. in an allegorical manner. Commenting on his teacher's explanation, Rashid Rida said that what was done by al-Ustadh (teacher), is no more as al-Ghazali. Rida points out that Abduh did not interpret Adam as a mere myth. Defending Abduh, Rida argued that Darwinism cannot answer whether humans originate from a single lineage or not. Hence, Rida argues that the Islamic creationist belief of Adam being the first man doesn't contradict Darwinism.

However, Rida sharply distanced himself from the figurative interpretation of Qur'an favoured by Abduh and Afghani. According to Rida, anybody who denied the historical existence of Adam and Abraham is guilty of apostasy. Like the medieval theologian Ibn Taymiyya, Rida held that there's no possibility of reason or science contradicting any Qur’anic text.

On istishan (juristic discretion), istislah and maslaha (public interest) 

Throughout his legal writings, Rida tried to demonstrate that Sharia was intended and suited to be a comprehensive legal structure for the Islamic society. In an early series of articles in Al-Manar titled “Debates Between the Reformer and the Slavish Imitator” (Muhäwarät al-Muslih wal-Muqallid), Rida takes the view that the fixed shar'i principles in the mu'ämalät (social transactions) are of only a general character, allowing for considerable adaptation by successive generations of Muslims in the light of the demands of their worldly welfare, while it is only the 'ibädät (governing matters of ritual and worship) that do not admit of interpretive change. According to Rashid Rida, the Hanafi principle of Istihsan (ruling in which a benefit to the Community is confirmed) is essentially an application of this spirit. However, Rida expanded the sancrosanct and unbending legal realm of the 'Ibadat to also incorporate personal and civil laws. According to Rida:“the rules of the šarīʿa in the like of marriage and divorce […] are from the category of ʿibādāt rules in that God is worshipped with them”

Rida divided Mu'amalat into two categories: i) moral issues and ii) morally irrelevant issues. The former are similar to 'Ibadat rules which were Revealed by God who defined moral norms and hence, fixed. Those who break these rules are sinful transgressors. The latter category of issues, can be solved through the process of Qiyas (analogical reasoning). Thus, like Istihsan, Qiyas is a fundamental principle necessary for the relevant application of the law. For medieval jurists such as Al-Qarafi, Ibn Taymiyya etc., istislah was but a logical extension of qiyas, whereby a consideration of utility neither explicitly enjoined nor excluded by the revealed texts would be assumed as a valid basis for judgment.  Rashid Rida adopted this rationale, acknowledging that the conclusions of istisläh were accordingly not legally binding as a firmly grounded qiyas (as opposed to a qiyas without precise textual basis), for "no individual is entitled to require or forbid others to perform an act without Divine authorization".

However, in matters of public policy this doesn't prevent the government from enacting ordinances based on utility, provided that the government rests on the proper foundations of "shura" (consultation) amongst ulul amr (qualified authorities) and that such ordinances do not conflict with clear Divine Revelation. Citing the Andalusian Faqih Ash-Shatibi  (d.790 H), Rida suggests that much of the legal rulings built through the meticulous process of Qiyas, can actually be reached by an equally valid (yet much simpler) process of istislah. Citing Al-Qarafi, Rida states that many ulema feared that tyrants would use "maslaha" as an excuse for following their desires and imposing absolutism upon their population. Rida concludes that the solution should be to reform the political system so that decisions of public policy and law rests on the hands of qualified persons - "ahl al-hall wal-'aqd" or "ulul amr" - through mutual consultation (shura) and ruler responsible to them. If this is done, "there will be no reason to fear that Masalih will be a means for corruption", Rida says, thus lifting the restrictions on deduction of legal ordinances. Such a choice of overturning Mu'amalat rulings are predicated on the condition of compulsion (darurah) and are only to be undertaken by a competent Faqih (jurist) who may derive the appropriate ruling based on his Ijtihad.

However, Rida was clear in specifying that general principles cannot supersede clear-cut texts. He stated that a soundly transmitted Scriptural text can only be superseded by a specific text which is more superior. It could also be superseded by general texts of Qurʾan and authentic hadiths that permit believers to prevent damage to themselves or to commit prohibited actions in a state of emergencies; such as endangerment of life. Rida asserted that such a permission is valid only during the situation of extreme necessity; and that the degree of allowance was proportional to the scope of necessity. Maintaining that Revealed texts are superior to Maslaha; Rida's legal approach towards the revealed texts and maṣlaḥa was based on the criterion and mechanisms elaborated by classical jurists such as Al-Shatibi and Al-Tufi. In addition, Rida's legal doctrine continued the juristic traditions of a number of prominent Fuqaha between the 10th and 14th centuries such as Al-Ghazali, Fakhr al-Din al-Razi, al-Qarafi, Ibn Taymiyya, etc. During these four centuries, Islamic jurists had commonly employed maṣlaḥa as an amenity for legal resolution and juristic dynamism. As Rida saw it, the classical jurists had sufficiently elaborated the “philosophical, moral and hermeneutical controls" for valid utilisation of the principles of Maslaha (public interest). Thus, he engaged with the traditional theoretical literature of classical Sunni Fiqh and conveyed its rich heritage to his readers in a sophisticated manner. Rida would also credit Al-Ghazali and Al-Shatibi for his revivalism of maṣlaḥa; which revamped the principle within the traditional legal framework of Qiyas (analogical reasoning).

Rida's doctrines would later be extended by modernists to uphold maslaha as an independent legal source, making qiyas dispensable and formulating positive laws directly on utilitarian grounds, for the "wisdom behind the Revealed Laws is no longer inscrutable", thus creating new implications. Throughout the 1920s, when such conclusions were drawn by the modernists based on these premises, Rida would object strenuously. He vehemently denounced the Egyptian lawyer Ahmed Safwat for promotion of "non-adherence to the texts" of Qur'an and Sunna in particular matters in the name of public utility. Although Rida stated that Mujtahids are obliged to take a broad view of all considerations affecting the public interest, "textual limits" had to be respected. The general public was obliged to follow the qualified Mujtahids unquestionably on mu'amalat (wordly Transactions) and their consensus was a legal source (hujja shar'iyya).

On Women 

Rashid Rida believed that Islam treats women and men equally in terms of their spiritual obligations and their ability to earn God's favor. He holistically addressed gender issues such as sexual freedom, women's exploitation in the workplace, and the rising cases of illegitimate children which were creating serious problems in European societies. He contrasted this with Islamic gender roles, which defined a woman's position in both household and society; and maintained that it represented the proper solution to the social problems faced by the most advanced societies.  While men are heads of the household, Islam granted women the right to choose a spouse and gave them clearly stipulated rights and responsibilities in a marriage. He also stipulated that consent of male guardian of women was essential for a Nikah (marriage) to be valid, since it stabilises the domestic order and befits the honor of both women and men. He criticised those followers of Hanafi school, who didn't adhere to this stipulation and confuted his position, as bigoted partisans to madhabs guilty of abandoning the Qur'an and Sunnah in favour of their law schools.

Rida was also a firm defender of traditional Islamic views on polygamy, presenting it as a solution to the emerging social ills afflicting societies; such as free mixing of men and women in workplaces and consequent sexual freedoms. In one of his last treatises "A Call to the Fair Sex" published in 1932, a treatise addressed to the Muslim women, Rida argued that polygamy not only solved the problems associated with promiscuity and its resultant evils, but also addressed the difficulties produced by the loss of numerous men in wars. The book condemned the calls for equality between men and women in the workplace and in politics; and warned about the folly of imitating Western women in their misguided ways. Rida declared that calls for "the liberation of women" and other social reforms by the modernisers were destroying the very fabric of Islamic societies. Rida also explained the etiquettes of veiling, emphasizing modesty for Muslim women, and addressed legal issues such as divorce. Although Rida hindered Muslim women from political participation, he encouraged association-based female Islamic activism; that called upon the government to outlaw free-mixing, wine-drinking, fronts of prostitution and demanded expansion of Islamic education for both males and females. In marital affairs, he held the view that wives are not obliged to cook, clean or take care of their children in Sharia and decried the hypocrisy of men who demanded more from their wives. At the same time, Rida asserted that husbands are allowed to discipline their wives, using force, if necessary.

While Rida encouraged Muslim women to participate in the social life of Islam as they did during the early Islamic eras, he would stress that men are more capable and superior in terms of strength, intelligence, learning, physical labour, etc. Hence, they have Wilayah (legal guardianship) over women; but similar to the ruler over his subjects, the male authority should be exercised through shura (consultation). In this, Muslim men should follow Muhammad, who set forth the perfect example of the kind treatment of wives. Rida also defended Islamic slavery, asserting that it protects women from harm and gives all of them a chance to bear children, and therefore, not in conflict with justice. According to Rida, the basic principle of Sharia concerning women, is that:

Definition of Ahl al-Kitab 
Rashid Rida belonged to a minority of Sunni scholars like Mujaddid Alif Thani Ahmad Sirhindi, etc. who widened the definition of Ahl al-Kitab to include Magians, Sabians, Buddhists, Brahmins, Confucianists and Shintoists; since they held that they too were recipients of previous abrogated Revelations that upheld Tawhid. In their opinion, since those religious sects believed in God, Prophets, Revelation, Day of Judgment, Paradise and Hell, they are similar to the Jews and Christians and fall under the Ahl al-Kitab category; despite not being mentioned in Qur'an. Rida posited that Qur'an confined to mention those groups such as Jews,  Christians, Sabi'is and Magians since they were known by the Arabs, to whom the Holy Qur'an was Revealed. He adopted this view from his discernment of the hadith "treat them in the same way as Ahl al-Kitab" regarding the Magians. Hence, Muslim men were permitted to engage in marital relations with women of these religions. Justifying this stance, Rida argued that marriages with non-Muslim women had been the manner of expanding the reach of Islam. However, Rida was clear in specifying that a Muslim woman was not allowed to marry a non-Muslim.

On riba 
Rida considered that certain types of riba (usury) may be permitted in certain cases (i.e. in cases of extreme poverty or larger public interest). The medieval scholar Ibn al-Qayyim had distinguished between two types of riba, riba al-nasi'ah and riba al-fadl. Ibn Qayyim maintained that rib al-nasi'ah was prohibited by Qur'an and Sunnah definitively while the latter was only prohibited in order to stop the charging of interest. According to Ibn Qayyim, the prohibition of riba al-fadl was less severe and it could be allowed in dire need or greater public interest (maslaha). Ibn Qayyim considered that things prohibited in order to prevent access to evil become permissible when they result in a greater benefit. Hence under a compelling need, an item may be sold with delay in return for dirhams or for another weighed substance despite implicating riba al-nasi'ah. In addition, Ibn Qayyim held that the sales of gold and silver jewelry for more than their equivalent weight in gold or silver was permissible, in consideration of workmanship and people's dire need. Although Ibn Qayyim clearly sought to restrict the scope of riba’s prohibition, he never stated that charging interest on loans was legal. In fact, Ibn Qayyim, relying on his reasoning, rejected the argument that coins (at the time made of gold and silver) could be sold for an excess in compensation for the minting process. In his opinion, although the authority gets them minted on wage payments, gold and silver should be used as a means of exchange, not trading with coins. Rida was influenced by both 'Abduh and Ibn Qayyims' legal reasonings.

As Grand Mufti of Egypt, 'Abduh had issued a fatwa in 1904 permitting to accept interest on deposits with the savings fund of the Egyptian post office. However, Rida was uneasy about 'Abduh's expansion of circumstances in which interest payment was permitted and chipped away at what 'Abduh had allowed. Rida glossed away 'Abduh's fatwa by suggesting that "Abduh only sanctioned returns on money deposited in this way on the understanding that the funds would be used for small investments by the post office in which the rules of transction would be strictly observed." He later would also highlight the public about "Abduh's fierce condemnation of the interest charged by the Egyptian banks." Most remarkably, Rida asserted that, as a direct violation of Divine command, riba rendered capitalism fundamentally at odds with an Islamic system.

Rida ruled that only the first increase in a termed loan is permissible in sharia, classifying it as Riba al-Fadl. Based on his analysis of the reports in Tafsir al Tabari that described the practice of riba during the pre-Islamic period, Rida distinguished the former from the usury practised during the pre-Islamic period (Ribā Âl-Jāhilīyyá). However, any further increase in returns or postponement of maturity date is unlawful. Differentiating between Riba al-Jahiliyya and other forms of Riba in his treatise Al-Ríba Fi Al-Mūamālat Fíl Islām ("Riba and Transactions in Islam"), Rida writes:

Fatwa on Qur'an Translations 
The debut of Turkish translations of Qur'an in the newly established Turkish Republic with state involvement would ignite considerable controversy throughout the Muslim world in 1924. Muhammad Rashid Rida, who was highly influential in shaping opinion in the Muslim world, portrayed the state-sponsored project as a long-term plot to displace the Arabic Qur'an. Rida was correct in his suspicions that Mustafa Kemal's regime sought to tamper with Islamic rituals and accused the Turkish government of promoting heretical ideas in order "to turn the devout people among them away from the word of God the Exalted, who revealed it to the Arabian Prophet Muhammad in the clear Arabic tongue".

In response to a query by Sheikh Ahsan Shah Effendi Ahmad (in Russia), Rida issued a fatwa prohibiting Qur'anic translations. Rida listed numerous negative objections such as 1) literal translation of Qur'an identical to original text being impossible 2) this trend will sever "Islamic ties of unity" by stoking racial divisions 3) translation of Qur'an doesn't have the same quality of Qur'an, as the meaning will be "limited" by the translator's understanding. However Rida was clear in the fatwa that prohibition was on translation of Arabic Qur'an to substitute it with a non-Arabic one. Rida's criticism was not against the general idea of Qur'anic translations (which are considered interpretations of the scripture of Islam in languages other than Arabic). He was against the possibility that Muslim nations would have a substitute to the original text, which in his opinion was heresy and lead to disunity among Muslim nations.

Fatwa on statues 
The emerging controversy over erecting statues in the early 20th-century Arab world was extensively addressed in the treatises of Rashid Rida. Rashid Rida believed that statues were forbidden in Islam, since they belonged to pagan traditions. According to him, statues were an imitation of un-Islamic cultures and also involved wasting people's money. Most notably, Rida vigorously campaigned against the statue-erection of the Egyptian nationalist leader Mustafa Kamil Pasha.

Anti-colonialism 
Rida focused on the relative weakness of Muslim societies vis-à-vis Western colonialism, blaming Sufi excesses, the blind imitation of the past (taqlid), the stagnation of the ulama, and the resulting failure to achieve progress in science and technology. He held that these flaws could be alleviated by a return to what he saw as the true principles of Islam albeit interpreted (ijtihad) to suit modern realities. This alone could, he believed, save Muslims from subordination to the colonial powers.

Tunisian Naturalisation issue 

In 1923, the French government had enacted a law for easier citizenship access to Tunisians. Responding to a query from Tunisia in 1924, Rashid Riḍā ruled that Muslims who naturalize are apostates; since they are guilty of giving preference to non-Muslim system of law. In 1932, he would issue another fatwa declaring the naturalized Tunisians as "enemies of Allah and His Prophet" and forbade them from being married or buried in Muslim cemeteries.

When France eased access for French citizenship for the French Protectorate of Tunisia in 1933, Rida backed the anti-naturalization protests. In line with the Salafi doctrine of Al Wala wal Bara, Rida issued a fatwa prohibiting the acquisition of citizenship of the colonial power, stating that it was apostasy from Islam:

On Freemasonry

Rashid Rida advanced anti-Semitic conspiracies which would later become popular across the Arab world and various Islamist movements. In Rida's worldview, Freemasonry was invented by Jews to plot against world nations. Rida's early mentors Afghani and Abduh used to have close relations with Freemasonry. Afghani had arrived in Egypt in 1871 with the mission to combat what he perceived as the threat of European imperialism. For al-Afghani, freemasonry was a means of shattering "the towering edifices of injustice, tyranny, and oppression" in Egypt. Afghani had utilised Freemasonry as an organizational base for subversive activities against the Egyptian ruler, Khedive Isma'il. The political faction later founded by Afghani, al-Hizb al Watanlal-Hurr ('The Free National Party') would play a major role in removing Ismail Pasha from the throne and bringing Tawfiq Pasha as the Khedive. In these efforts, Afghani was also aided by his disciples such as Muhammad Abduh whom he persuaded to join Freemasonry. Through these associations, Abduh was able to establish contacts with Tawfiq Pasha and other leaders of Egypt. In his later life, however, Abduh would distance himself from his past associations with freemasonry. Afghani and Abduh would later withdraw from Freemasonry due to political disputes. Years later, Rida would ask 'Abduh why he and Afghani had become Masons, 'Abduh replied that it was for a "political and social purpose". Rida pointed to Abduh that the objective of the Masons was "the destruction of all the religions." His attitudes towards Baháʼí Faith were also negative.

From the turn of nineteenth century, Rida's Al-Manar periodical would regularly feature anti-semitic articles linking Jews and Freemasons who eagerly sought the exploitation of "all nations’ wealth for its own benefit". By the 1930s, Rida would also promote the ideas of Protocols of the Elders of Zion. Conspiracy theories accusing Freemasons and Jews of seeking to topple the existing order through secret machinations featured regularly in Al-Manar. In his articles, Rida maintained that the Jews created Freemasonry and through it orchastrated the Young Turk revolution in the Ottoman Empire in 1908 and French Revolution of 1789 and manipulated the Bolsheviks against the Czar. By 1910, Rashid Rida believed that Ottoman Empire had fallen under a Zionist-Masonic influence due to the Young Turk Revolution. Adopting a narrative of a grand, global Jewish conspiracy; Rida described that the Jews, oppressed by the Catholic Church, had orchestrated through the Freemasons the French Revolution, 1905 Russian Revolution and the Young Turk Revolution. According to Rida, the revolution of Young Turks was a Jewish response to the Ottoman Empire's rejection of Jewish ambitions to regain possession of their temple in Jerusalem and surrounding regions to reestablish their kingdom. Rida argued that Jews wielded immense influence over the Committee of Union and the treasury of the Ottoman Empire. As early as 1908, he had alleged about a Zionist plan to purchase Palestine from the Freemasons in Turkish leadership and called upon Arabs to resist this plan by force. By March 1914, Rida believed that the Zionists had already managed to convince the Committee of Union and Progress to support Jewish rule in Palestine as a buffer against the Arabs and as a means to divide them.

According to Rida, the term ‘Freemason’ itself refers to the re-construction of the temple of Solomon. In his articles, Rida emphasized that although the founders of Freemasonry were Jews and Christians, Jews led and dominated the movement. Rida viewed freemasonry as a Jewish invention and one of the tools of Jews in their bid to re-establish a Jewish state and rebuild Solomon's temple in Jerusalem.  They dominated the Freemasons, concealing the ultimate objective of establishing a Jewish state and overthrowing the religious governments in Europe, Russia, and Turkey, where Islamic law was replaced by a secularist government. Although the Jesuits were able to thwart their influence in Catholic countries, Jews succeeded in establishing Bolshevism in Russia and secularise Turkey. Explaining his beliefs, Rida wrote in his famous 1929 article Revolution in Palestine: Its Causes and Consequences (Thawrat Filastin: Asbabuha wa nata’ijuha) in Al-Manar:

Reception 
Despite some un-conventional stances held by Rida, his works and in particular his magazine al-Manar spread throughout the Muslim world; influencing many individuals including the popular Salafi writer Muhammad Nasiruddin al-Albani.

The status of Rida and his works, are a matter of contention amongst some contemporary purist Salafis. Unlike the Purist Salafis, Rashid Rida considered rulers who legislated man-made laws contrary to sharia to be guilty of kufr akbar (major disbelief). According to Rida, Muslims are obliged to force such rulers to annul such laws or overthrow them. If they are unable to do that, their lands can no longer be considered Dar-al-Islam (abode of Islam). Owing to this, some present-day Salafi Purists criticise Rida for straying from quietist Salafi principles. The pro-government Madkhali Salafists condemn Rida for his influence on Salafi-activists, Islamists and Salafi-Jihadists. However, other Salafi scholars such as Albani, while critiquing his mistakes on Hadeeth sciences, praises Rida and his works generally. Praising Rashid Rida and his scholarly contributions, Al-Albani stated:

Islamic Political Theory

Rashid Rida is widely regarded as one of "the ideological forefathers" of contemporary Islamist movements. Rida's ideas were foundational to the development of the modern "Islamic state". He "was an important link between classical theories of the caliphate, such as al-Mawardi's, and 20th-century notions of the Islamic state". While rejecting secularist calls for separation of religion and state with regards to Islam, Rida nevertheless contended that those who engage in defence of Islam, its propagation and its teaching should not engage in politics, in line with orthodox Sunni doctrine.

Rashid Rida preceded Abul Ala Maududi, Sayyid Qutb, and later Islamists in declaring adherence to sharia (Islamic law) as essential for Islamic rulers, saying:

Historical Analysis 
The corruption and tyranny of Muslim rulers (caliphs, sultans, etc.) throughout history was a central theme in Rida's criticisms. Rida, however, celebrated the rule of Muhammad and the Rightly Guided Caliphs, and leveled his attacks at subsequent rulers who could not maintain Muhammad's example.  He also criticized the Islamic scholars (ulama) for compromising their integrity - and the integrity of the Islamic law (sharia) they were meant to uphold - by associating with corrupt worldly powers. Rida believed that throughout Islamic history, the feudal monarchs and the depraved Ulema classes had disfigured the ideal caliphate system, leading to social chaos and institutionalising corruption of authoritarian rulers. He expounded the revival of an ideal, veritable “Islamic state” political system, and reverse this status-quo.

Arab Pre-eminence 
Rashid Rida also believed that the awakening of Arabs was an important prerequisite for Islamic Renaissance. Since it was during the early days of Arab power that Islamic power reached its pinnacle; only the Arab nation could restore the might of early Islam. By constantly stressing on Arab pre-eminence; Rida pointed out that only Arabs can take up the "historic mission" of Islamic Unity. Rida's calls for the restoration of Arab leadership were rooted in his pan-Islamist programme that sought the establishment of an Islamic Caliphate and viewed nationalist trends as a plot to divide the Muslim World. Hence, he strongly criticised Arab nationalism; portraying it as a starting point to kufr (disbelief).

Rida viewed Arabic language as the common medium that unites Muslims of all nations and promoted Arabic as an integral pillar of his reform efforts. Issuing a Fatwa stipulating that knowledge of Arabic is obligatory on every Muslim, Rida wrote in Al-Manar:

Jihad 
Rashid Rida opposed secularist criticisms which accused religion of being responsible for wars and human suffering; asserting that the materialist and irreligious conceptions of humanity that were the prime instigators of warfare and bloodshed throughout history. In Rida's view, wars are an integral component of human history and Islamic law regulated conflicts to just wars based on the doctrine of Jihad. He praised the religious campaigns of Prophet Muhammad and Rashidun Caliphate as an exemplary model of Jihad to be emulated against the European imperial powers.

Rashid Rida believed that Islam prescribed armed Jihad as a binding duty upon all capable male Muslims; not only to defend the religion but also to bring non-Muslims into the fold of the Islamic faith. However, since the obligation of Jihad cannot be performed unless they are strong,  their immediate task was to acquire the sciencitific and technical prowess first, in order to fulfill the duty of Jihad. While upholding Jihad as a necessary duty, Rida nonetheless distinguished between wars to spread Islam (Jihad al-Talab) and wars to defend Islam (Jihad al-Daf). While the latter are always obligatory; Jihad to expand Islam into non-Muslim territories (Dar al-Harb) is not obligatory unless Muslims are not allowed to live according to sharia or unless Islamic Da'wa (preaching) efforts were hampered by the non-Muslim state.

Jahiliyya and Hakimiyya 

Rashid Rida revived Ibn Taymiyya's concept of jahiliyya, a Qur'anic term that denoted the ignorance of pre-Islamic Arabia. He applied this concept to Muslim lands of his own era and charged the ruling secular authorities with apostasy for submitting to man-made laws and substituting Islamic laws, in the same manner Ibn Taymiyya ex-communicated the Tatars. Rida argued that only salafiyya Islam, "an Islam purged of impurities and Western influences", could save Muslims from colonial subordination and Jahiliyya. He detested the rulers who substituted Western laws for sharia and takfired them stating: 

Rashid Rida believed that Islamic law was flexible enough to remain relevant for all eras and was staunchly opposed to influences of foreign law-codes. The Islamic state is to be based on Hakimiyya (“sovereignty of Allah”) and it "does not recognize the sovereignty of the people, and the state denies people's legislative power”. Muslim politicians must engage with the state's social, political, economic and process of the state according to the sources of Islamic law.

Explaining the four basic, agreed upon sources of Islamic law; Rashid Rida wrote:

Shura 
Throughout his works, Rashid Rida emphasized that sharia was intended to be a comprehensive legal structure for the society. He promoted a restoration of the Caliphate for Islamic unity, through shura". In theology, his reformist ideas, like those of Abduh, were "based on the argument that:

Rida's Islamic state envisioned a representative government, which he compared to be "a sort of a republic", that upholds Shura (Islamic consultative system) in political life. The Khalifa has no superiority in law over his subjects; and his duty is only to execute the religious law(sharia) and act according to national interests. The Caliph must uphold truth, social justice and the rule of law; cleanse bid'a (innovations), eliminate oppression and consult his advisors in issues not verifiable by the Quran and Sunnah. The caliph is not a Ma'sum(infallible) or a source of revelation and was responsible for all his deeds. The nation has the right to depose the caliph, for valid reasons. Every member of the Ummah had a right to question the Caliph for his errors. The best possible way to bring about a strong caliphate was through a detailed application "of the rules of the Shariah." One of these rules is involved the appointment of ahl al-hal wa-l 'aqd (the group who loosen and bind), a group of Muslim representatives who have the right to take council(mushabaha) with a Caliph as well as the power to both appoint and remove him of behalf of the Ummah. Since the state uses Islamic law as its guiding principle, the Ulema were not only responsible for the sacred mission of reforming the society, but also responsible for correcting the monarch, by holding him accountable to Sharia. The Fuqaha were also to engage in Ijtihad by referring to the Scriptures, and evaluate contemporary conditions to enhance the vitality of the law. In a jibe against his theological opponents, Rida also remarked that their forsaking of Ijtihad had sunk Muslims into ignorance and "westernization and atheism."

The two major books outlining the Political Doctrines of Rashid Rida are: i) Al-Khilafa aw al-Imama al-ʿUzma ("The Caliphate or the Grand Imamate") ii) 'al-Waḥī al-Muḥammadī ("The Muhammadan Revelation")

The Caliphate or the Grand Imamate (1922) 

Al-Khilafa aw al-Imama al-ʿUzma is an influential treatise written by Rashid Rida in 1922, during the aftermath of the Turkish Abolition of the Ottoman Sultanate. The treatise outlined a comprehensive Islamic state theory by taking precedence from classical Sunni doctrines; especially those of Al-Mawardi. The treatise would become an authoritative reference for modern Islamist movements.

The Muhammadan Revelation (1933) 
Rashid Riḍā's final substantial treatise The Muhammadan Revelation (al-Waḥī al-Muḥammadī), published in 1933, was a manifesto in which he proclaimed that Islam is the only savior for the deteriorating West. Insisting that Islam called for the Brotherhood of all people, opposing all forms of racist hierarchies that were responsible for the World War and the corrupted League of Nations, Rashid Rida presented a Universal Islamic Order as a substitute for the crumbling Wilsonian system.

Articulating the Islamic vision of Reformation for humanity, Rashid Rida wrote:

Rashid Rida blamed the horrors of the First World War on European nationalism and racial obsession. Introducing Islam as the solution for World peace, Rida explained the Five important Islamic teachings on Jihad:

 The Prohibition Against Initiating Hostilities :- The Islamic policy towards Arabs was to free them from paganism, and purifying the entire Arabian peninsula of the influence of idolatry and maintain it as an Islamic bastion. However, Islam allowed non-Arabs to live freely and continue to practice their faith and prohibited from initiating aggression against them. On the other hand, Muslims are commanded to fight the aggressors until they are defeated.
 The Purpose of War :- The purpose of Jihad is to restore the Islamic order, which ensures that Muslims worship Allah and no other, elevate His word, implementing the sharia, guaranteeing freedom to call to Islam and protection of non-Muslims from oppression and forceful conversions.
 Peace Must Always Come Before War :- Peace was to be the ideal state of affairs between Muslims and non-Muslims. War is an option only under extreme circumstances.
 Readiness for War :- Muslims must always be in a state of preparation for war; so as to deter any potential aggression.
 Mercy towards Enemies :- After victory in war, Muslims should forget the previous hostilities. Prisoners should either be sent back or kept as ransom.
According to Rida, Islam is a comprehensive religion, which, in addition to dealing with ethics and spirituality; also elaborated on leadership, politics and government. The Islamic state symbolised "the greatest political reform" brought forth by the Qur'an in an age when all of humanity were shackled by various manifestations of tyranny. Taking the Khulafa Rashidun as the exemplar models, Rashid Rida elaborated on the basic features of an Islamic government:

Influence on Islamists 
The Islamic political doctrines of Rashid Rida would deeply influence many future Islamists like Hasan al-Banna, Sayyid Qutb, etc. as well as subsequent fundamentalist movements across the Arab world. In 1928, Rashid Rida published Majmuʿat al-rasaʾil wa al-masaʾil al-najdiyya (Collection of Treatises and Questions from Najd); one of the earliest occurrences wherein the doctrine of  Al-Walāʾ wa al-barā (loyalty and disavowal) was emphasised alongside Tawhid in the Salafi context, a doctrine would become important in militant Jihadist circles. Egyptian school teacher Hasan al-Banna, was highly influenced by Rashid Rida's Salafiyya movement as well his Pan-Islamist activities through socio-political means to re-generate an Islamic state. Continuing Rida's work, Al-Banna would go on to establish the Muslim Brotherhood, a mass political party which sought to establish an Islamic state in Egypt, within the existing constitutional framework. The movement demanded the Egyptian government to recognize Sharia as the supreme source of law and remove the European law codes.

The Islamic State Theory of Rashid Rida was also adopted by Usama Bin Laden and Ayman al Zawahiri. Throughout their references of "Islamic State" and "Caliphate", Bin Laden and Zawahiri followed the terminology as advocated by Rashid Rida and later embraced by Hasan al-Banna; which differentiated between an Islamic State and the Caliphate. In contrast to other Islamist movements like Hizb ut-Tahrir who believed that a Caliphate is the only valid government; the two Al-Qaeda leaders believed in the legitimacy of multiple Islamic national states referring to them as Emirates, such as the Islamic Emirate of Afghanistan and Saudi Arabia until the 1990s when it lost legitimacy according to Bin Laden.

In developing the pan-Islamist model of Afghani, Rida had specifically admired the model of the Khulafa Rashidun, and resurrected Ibn Taymiyya's concept of Jahiliyya. Moving towards a militant and conservative sphere of revivalist teachings, Rida condemned the secular authorities of his era to be apostates; just like the Mongols during the era of Ibn Taymiyya. Furthermore, he condemned the state-backed scholars for neglecting the revival of the traditions and values of early eras of Islam. Rida's insistence that only an Islamic world completely free of Western influences could escape the colonial noose and the state of Jahiliyya, set the foundations of future Salafi-Jihadist ideologies. Rida's strategy to establish an Islamic State is also believed to have influenced the Islamic State of Iraq and Levant in their 2014 declaration of Caliphate in Mosul.

Legacy

Muhammad Rashid Rida is considered by Salafis as an erudite scholarly authority for contemporary reference. Rida's works are taught in the Islamic University of Medina, an influential Salafi seminary. Salafi scholar Muhammad 'Abdullah Salman authored a book in his praise, titled, al-Shaykh Rashid Rida al-Musleh al-Salafi (al-Shaykh Rashid Rida the Salafi Reformer).   Rida's efforts were instrumental in fostering the modern trans-national network of Salafi scholarship across the world. Early Salafi ulema of Egypt would build extensive relations with Wahhabi scholars through education, travel, religious gatherings, etc. These included Muhammad Hamid al-Fiqi, ʿAbd al-Razzaq Hamzah, ʿAbd al-Zahir Abu al-Samh, etc. who were the pupils of Rida. These ʿulama would continue writing against innovations and various Sufi practices within the theological framework laid down by Ibn Taymiyyah, the Najdis, and Rashid Rida. Their organisation, Ansar al-Sunnah al Muhammadiyyah would become the bastion of Salafiyya school in Egypt. Apart from the Purist Salafis, Salafi activists (harakis) also look up to Rida's works to build a revivalist platform focused on Islamic socio-political and cultural reforms (Islah) with a long-term objective to establish an Islamic state. Prominent figures in this rival camp include Abu Hanieh, Safar Al-Hawali, Abu Qatada, Muhammad Surur, Abdurrahman Abdulkhaliq, etc. Abu Qatada and Abu Hanieh established a new movement known as Ahl Al-Sunnah Wal Jama’a based in Jordan and published al-Manar magazine named after Rashid Rida's popular monthly.

Rashid Rida's religious efforts not only influenced the Arab World, but also made major impact in South Asia and South East Asia. Rida got numerous requests for fatwas from his followers in Indonesia and South East Asia, and answered them through his seminal journal Al-Manar. These fatwas were regarded by the indigenous reform-oriented scholars as their main source of inspiration and became influential in shaping the intellectual thought of religious circles in 20th century Indonesia, introducing them to Salafi reformist ideals. Numerous reformist scholars corresponded with Rida and popularised the ideals of Salafiyya.

The influential activist-Salafi organisation Islamic Assembly of North America (IANA), which played a crucial role in the spread of Salafism across North America, drew inspiration from Muhammad Rashid Rida. The official publication of the organisation was a magazine titled Al-Manar al-Jadid (“the New Lighthouse”) in honour of Rashid Rida's legacy. The magazine's prologue was copied verbatim from Rida's original 19th century text; believing that the Muslim community continued to face "the same tribulations" as during Rida's era. The organisation included notable scholars and figures like Bilal Philips, Muhammad Adly, Jamal Zarabozo, Abdel Rahman al-Dosari, etc. After 9/11, IANA would be subject to intense federal scrutiny. As a result of this policy in the post 9/11 period, IANA was eventually forced to disband; many members were deported, and some others, like Ali al-Timimi, were jailed.

Salafi scholar Nasir al Din Al Albani considered Rashid Rida to be his mentor. As an avid reader of Al-Manar, Albani embraced key Traditionalist Salafi ideas through Rida's works and adopted Rida as his intellectual father. For Albani, Riḍā exemplified the standard of how to look to ḥadith for reviving the Muslim community. Crediting Rida for his turn to Salafism and interest in hadith sciences, Albani stated: 

In his treatise "The Exoneration" written in response to Sayyid Imam Al-Sharif, Salafi-jihadist leader Ayman al Zawahiri cited the anti-colonial fatwa of Rashid Rida (against French naturalization) to argue that a Muslim who applies for Western citizenship by his own choice is guilty of kufr(disbelief) or close to kufr. Islamic scholar Yusuf al-Qaradawi described Rida as "the true mujaddid of Islam of his time" and views him as the most prominent scholar who advocated traditionalism in contemporary Islamic history. Qaradawi described Rida's thought as a "lighthouse" that "guided the ship of Islam in modern history".

Albani's son ‘Abd Allah praised Rashid Rida as "muhaddith Misr" (the ḥadīth scholar of Egypt). The Egyptian Salafi hadith scholar Ahmad Shakir conferred the title of Hujjat al-Islam to Rashid Rida and extolled his Qur'anic commentary, Tafsir al-Manar as a "real defense of religion" in the contemporary era, encouraging everyone to read as well as spread his Tafsir. Rida's teachings also deeply influenced the prominent Saudi scholar Ibn 'Uthaymeen who listed Rida as his chief source of scholarly influence alongside Ibn Taymiyya. Ibn 'Uthaymeen commended Rida as an exemplar scholar of sharia who had the combined knowledge of religious sciences as well political and economic affairs.

Grand Imam of al-Azhar, Mustafa al-Maraghi praised Rida as the champion of Salafi thought during his funeral saying:

Works

The following is a list of some of the works published by Shaykh Rashid Rida:

 Tafsir al-Qur’an al-Hakim known as Tafsir al-Manar (The commentary on Qur‘an which 'Abduh began but did not complete beyond surat al-Nisa‘ IV, verse 125. Rida continued up to surat Yusuf XII, verse 100)
 Al-Tafsir al-Mukhtasar al-Mufid (This was intended as a summary of the former work, which was begun by Rida and published by Muhammad Ahmad Kan'an and Zuhayr al-Shawish as Mukhtasar Tafsir al-Manar, 3 vols, Beirut-Damascus, 1984)
 Al-Manar Journal (The first volume was published in the second section of the last volume (volume 35) and distributed after his death on 29th Rabi'i II, 1354–1935)
 Tarikh al-Ustaz al-Imam al-Shaykh Muhammad ‘Abduh (A biography of Egyptian Grand Mufti Muhammad Abduh published in three volumes)
 Nida’ lil Jins al-Latif or Huqkq al-Mar’ah fi al-Islam ("A Call to the Fair Sex" or "Women's Rights in Islam"). This was translated into many languages.
 Al-Wahy al-Muhammadi (A Book that provides rational and historical proofs indicating that the Qur‘an is a Divine Revelation)
 Tarjamat al-Qur‘an wa ma fiha min Mafasid wa Munafat al-Islam, Matba'at al-Manar, Cairo, 1344–1926
 Dhikra al-Mawlid al-Nabawi (A summary of Prophetic biography)
 Al-Wahda al-Islamiiyya ("Islamic Unity") The major part of this work was first published under the title Muhawarat al-Muslih wa al-Muqallid ("Debates between the Reformer and the Imitator")
 Yusr al-Islam wa Uskl al-Tashri‘ al-‘Āmm ("The Accommodating Spirit of Islam and the Sources of General Jurisprudence") published in 1928.
 Al-Khilafa aw al-Imama al-‘Uzma ("The Caliphate and the Greater Imamate")
 Al-Sunna wa al-Shari‘a ("The Prophetic Tradition and Islamic Law")
 Al-Muslimin wa al-Qibt ("Muslims and the Copts")
 Al-Wahhabiyyun wa al-Hijaz ("The Wahhabites and the Hijaz")
 Al-Manar wa al-Azhar ("Al-Manar and al-Azhar")

See also
List of Islamic scholars

Bibliography
 Hourani, Albert (1962). Arabic Thought in The Liberal Age 1798-1939. Cambridge University Press. ISBN 978-0-521-27423-4

References

Notes

External links
 

 
 
 

Mujaddid
Quranic exegesis scholars
Arab Sunni Muslim scholars of Islam
Syrian Muslim scholars of Islam
Syrian Sunni Muslim scholars of Islam
20th-century Muslim scholars of Islam
Editors of religious publications
Shafi'is
Muslim reformers
Atharis
Critics of Ibn Arabi
1865 births
1935 deaths
Wahhabists
Sunni Muslim scholars of Islam
Syrian Salafis
Egyptian Salafis
Salafi scholars
Salafi Islamists
Syrian magazine founders
People from Beirut vilayet